Wartime sexual violence is rape or other forms of sexual violence committed by combatants during armed conflict, war, or military occupation often as spoils of war, but sometimes, particularly in ethnic conflict, the phenomenon has broader sociological motives. Wartime sexual violence may also include gang rape and rape with objects. A war crime, it is distinguished from sexual harassment, sexual assaults and rape committed amongst troops in military service.

During war and armed conflict, rape is frequently used as a means of psychological warfare in order to humiliate the enemy. Wartime sexual violence may occur in a variety of situations, including institutionalized sexual slavery, wartime sexual violence associated with specific battles or massacres, as well as individual or isolated acts of sexual violence.

Rape can also be recognized as genocide when it is committed with the intent to destroy, in whole or in part, a targeted group. International legal instruments for prosecuting perpetrators of genocide were developed in the 1990s, and the Akayesu case of the International Criminal Tribunal for Rwanda was widely considered a precedent. However, these legal instruments have so far only been used for international conflicts, thus putting the burden of proof in citing the international nature of conflict in order for prosecution to proceed.

Definition of wartime sexual violence

There is no consensus definition of wartime sexual violence, as there is variance in what forms of violence are included in the definition and variance in which violence is considered conflict-related. The terms rape, sexual assault and sexual violence are frequently used interchangeably. The Explanatory Note of the Rome Statute, which binds the International Criminal Court, defines rape as follows:
The perpetrator invaded the body of a person by conduct resulting in penetration, however slight, of any part of the body of the victim or of the perpetrator with a sexual organ, or of the anal or genital opening of the victim with any object or any other part of the body.
and
The invasion was committed by force, or by threat of force or coercion, such as that caused by fear of violence, duress, detention, psychological oppression or abuse of power, against such person or another person, or by taking advantage of a coercive environment, or the invasion was committed against a person incapable of giving genuine consent.

The concept of "invasion" is intended to be broad enough to be gender-neutral and the definition is understood to include situations where the victim may be incapable of giving genuine consent if affected by natural, induced or age-related incapacity.

A prominent data-set on conflict-related sexual violence, Sexual Violence in Armed Conflict (SVAC), builds on the ICC definition and covers seven forms of violence: "(a) rape, (b) sexual slavery, (c) forced prostitution, (d) forced pregnancy, (e) forced sterilization/abortion, (f) sexual mutilation, and (g) sexual torture." The data-set defines conflict-related sexual violence as the sexual violence committed "armed actors (specifically, state militaries, rebel groups, and progovernment militias) during periods of conflict or immediately postconflict," thus excluding sexual violence by civilians. More expansive definitions may define wartime sexual violence as being committed even by civilians if the conflict creates a sense of impunity.

In 2009, the UN established a mandate and adopted SCR 1888 resolution 2009 to tackle conflict-related sexual violence (CRSV) as a peace and security issue and related violations. CRSV refers to rape, sexual slavery, forced prostitution, forced pregnancy, forced abortion, enforced sterilization, forced marriage, trafficking in persons when committed in situations of conflict for the purpose of sexual violence/exploitation and any other form of sexual violence of comparable gravity perpetrated against women, men, girls or boys that is directly or indirectly linked to a conflict.

History of laws against sexual assault during war 

Prosecution of rapists in war crime tribunals was rare prior to the late 1990s. Askin argued that the lack of explicit recognition of war rape in international law or applicable humanitarian law can not be used as a defense by a perpetrator of war rape. Laws and customs of war prohibit offenses such as "inhuman treatment" or "indecent assaults", adding to this domestic military codes and domestic civil codes (national law) may make sexual assault a crime.

In 1999, humanitarian law concerned the maltreatment of civilians and "any devastation not justified by military necessity".

Classical period

The ancient Greeks considered war rape of women "socially acceptable behavior well within the rules of warfare", and warriors considered the conquered women "legitimate booty, useful as wives, concubines, slave labor, or battle-camp trophy". One of the first references to the "laws of war", or "traditions of war" was by Cicero, who urged soldiers to observe the rules of war, since obeying the regulations separated the "men" from the "brutes". Conquering the riches and property of an enemy was regarded as legitimate reason for war in itself. Women were included with "property", since they were considered under the lawful ownership of a man, whether a father, husband, slave master, or guardian. In this context, the rape of a woman was considered a property crime committed against the man who owned the woman.

Pre-modern Europe
In the Middle Ages, the Catholic Church sought to prevent rape during feudal warfare through the institution of Peace and Truce of God (first proclaimed in 989) which discouraged soldiers from attacking women and civilians in general and through the propagation of a Christianized version of chivalry ideal of a knight who protected innocents and did not engage in lawlessness.

In 1159, John of Salisbury wrote Policraticus in an attempt to regulate the conduct of armies engaged in "justifiable" wars. Salisbury believed that acts of theft and "rapine" (property crimes) should receive the most severe punishment, but also believed that obeying a superior's commands whether legal or illegal, moral or immoral, was the ultimate duty of the soldier.

Rape and pillage were prohibited by some army codes as early as the 14th century because of the tendency to create strong hostility in civilian populations and the detrimental effects to army discipline. Despite early efforts to systematize the laws of war, rape continued to be a problem in the 15th and 16th centuries. The influential writer Francisco de Vitoria stood for a gradual emergence of the notion that glory or conquest were not necessarily acceptable reasons to start a war. The jurist Alberico Gentili insisted that all women, including female combatants, should be spared from sexual assault in wartime.

It is suggested that one reason for the prevalence of war rape was that at the time, military circles supported the notion that all persons, including women and children, were still the enemy, with the belligerent having conquering rights over them. In the late Middle Ages, the laws of war even considered war rape as an indication of a man's success in the battlefield and "opportunities to rape and loot were among the few advantages open to... soldiers, who were paid with great irregularity by their leaders.... triumph over women by rape became a way to measure victory, part of a soldier's proof of masculinity and success, a tangible reward for services rendered.... an actual reward of war".

During this period in history, war rape took place not necessarily as a conscious effort of war to terrorize the enemy, but rather as earned compensation for winning a war. There is little evidence to suggest that superiors regularly ordered subordinates to commit acts of rape. Throughout this period of history, war became more regulated, specific, and regimented. The first formal prosecution for war crimes did not take place until the late Middle Ages.

Early modern Europe

Hugo Grotius, considered the father of the law of nations and the first to conduct a comprehensive work on systematizing the international laws of war, De jure belli ac pacis (1625), concluded that rape (phrased as "the violation of women") "should not go unpunished in war any more than in peace", rejecting the view that it is permissible to inflict damage or harm "on anything belonging to the enemy":

Emmerich van Vattel emerged as an influential figure when he pleaded for the immunity of civilians against the ravages of war, considering men and women civilians as non-combatants.

In the late 18th century and 19th century, treaties and war codes started to include vague provisions for the protection of women: The Treaty of Amity and Commerce (1785) specified that in case of war "women and children.... shall not be molested in their persons". Article 20 of the Order No. 20 (1847), a supplement to the US Rules and Articles of war, listed the following as severely punishable "Assassination, murder, malicious stabbing or maiming, rape". The Declaration of Brussels (1874) stated that the "honours and rights of the family.... should be respected" (article 38).

In the 19th century, the treatment of soldiers, prisoners, the wounded, and civilians improved when core elements of the laws of war were put in place by nations who were signatories to treaties.  However, while the customs of war mandated more humane treatment of soldiers and civilians, new weapons and advanced technology increased destruction and altered the methods of war.

The Lieber Code (1863) was the first codification of the international customary laws of land war and an important step towards humanitarian law. The Lieber Code emphasized protection of civilians and stated that "all rape... [is] prohibited under the penalty of death", which was the first prohibition of rape in customary humanitarian law.

20th century
During the 20th century, international legal procedures attempted to prevent and prosecute perpetrators of war rape. Similarly, individual states developed laws pertaining to war rape's victims and perpetrators.

The prohibition of rape was excluded from the grave breaches spelled out in the Geneva Conventions and was deliberately left vague by the Hague Conventions. Article 46 of the Hague Conventions of 1899 and 1907 regarding Land Warfare required only that "[f]amily honour and rights [and] the lives of persons... must be respected" by the occupying powers.

After World War I, the Commission of Responsibilities, set up in 1919 to examine the atrocities committed by the German Empire and the other Central Powers during the war, found substantial evidence of sexual violence and subsequently included rape and forced prostitution among the violations of the laws and customs of war. Efforts to prosecute failed.

World War II
The Nuremberg and Tokyo Tribunals became the first international courts of real significance. The victorious Allied powers established them in 1945 and 1946 respectively to prosecute the major war criminals of the European Axis powers (in fact only Germans) and of Japan for crimes against peace, war crimes, and crimes against humanity. The possibility of prosecuting sexual violence as a war crime was present because of the recognition of war rape as serious violation of the laws of war in the Hague Conventions of 1899 and 1907 assertion that "[f]amily honour and rights [and] the lives of persons... must be respected."

While the Nuremberg Tribunals failed to charge Nazi war criminals with rape, witnesses testified about it occurring. Previous war crimes trials had prosecuted for sex crimes, hence war rape could have been prosecuted under customary law and/or under the IMT (International Military Tribunals) Charter's Article 6(b): "abduction of the civilian population.... into slavery and for other purposes" and "abduction unjustified by military necessity". Similarly, it would have been possible to prosecute war rape as crime against humanity under Article 6(c) of the Nuremberg Charter: "other inhumane acts" and "enslavement". However, notwithstanding evidence of sexual violence in Europe during World War II, a lack of will led to rape and sexual violence not being prosecuted at the Nuremberg Tribunals.

The International Military Tribunal for the Far East did convict Japanese officers "of failing to prevent rape" in the Nanjing Massacre, which is known as the "Rape of Nanking". The tribunal, in Tokyo, prosecuted cases of sexual violence and war rape as war crimes under the wording "inhumane treatment", "ill-treatment", and "failure to respect family honour and rights". According to the prosecution, in excess of 20,000 women and girls were raped during the first weeks of the Japanese occupation of the Chinese city of Nanking. The War Crimes Tribunal in Tokyo included accounts of sexual violence crimes in the trial testimonies as well as public records. On a national level, a commander of the 14th Area Army, General Yamashita, was convicted for, inter alia, "rape under his command". Some 35 Dutch comfort women brought a successful case before the Batavia Military Tribunal in 1948.

It is well known that brutal mass rapes were committed against German women; both during and after World War II. According to some estimates, over 100,000 women were raped by Soviet soldiers in Berlin both during and after The Battle of Berlin.

The phrase "from eight to 80" was used to describe potential victims of Soviet mass-rape. "Red Army soldiers don't believe in 'individual liaisons' with German women," wrote the playwright Zakhar Agranenko in his diary when he was serving as an officer of the marine infantry in East Prussia. "Nine, ten, twelve men at a time – they rape them on a collective basis." Rape was regarded by men in the Soviet army as a well-deserved form of punishment, whether the civilians had anything to do with the war or not. In total, historians estimate that over two million German women were raped.

Marocchinate (Italian for "Moroccan' deeds") is a term which is applied to the mass rape and killings which were committed after the Battle of Monte Cassino in Italy during World War II. These mass rapes and killings were mainly committed by the Moroccan Goumiers, colonial troops of the French Expeditionary Corps (FEC), commanded by General Alphonse Juin, and the victims of these crimes were civilian women and girls, as well as men and boys, in the rural area between Naples and Rome. In Italian, the incident is traditionally known as marocchinate.

The Italian Senate launched an investigation, reaching the conclusion that 2,000 women were raped, as well as 600 men:Over 2,000 women were raped, the youngest at 11, the oldest at 86. Dozens died. Six hundred men suffered the same fate. Among them a young parish priest, who died two days after the torture suffered. Two sisters, aged 15 and 18, suffered the violence of 200 Moroccan soldiers.

1949 Geneva Conventions

Common Article 3 of the 1949 Geneva Conventions provides that "violence to life and person, in particular murder of all kinds, mutilation, cruel treatment and torture" and "outrages upon personal dignity, in particular humiliating and degrading treatment" are prohibited under any circumstance whatsoever with respect to persons who are hors de combat or who are not taking part of direct hostilities in internal conflicts.

Article 27 of the 1949 Fourth Geneva Convention explicitly prohibits wartime rape and enforced prostitution in international conflicts.

The prohibitions outlined in the 1949 Geneva Conventions were reinforced by the 1977 Additional Protocols I and II to the 1949 Geneva Conventions.

The United Nations Declaration on the Protection of Women and Children in Emergency and Armed Conflict, which went into effect in 1974, does not mention rape specifically.

International Criminal Tribunal for Rwanda
In 1998, the International Criminal Tribunal for Rwanda established by the United Nations made landmark decisions defining genocidal rape (rape intended to affect a population or culture as a whole) as a form of genocide under international law. In the trial of Jean-Paul Akayesu, the mayor of Taba Commune in Rwanda, the Trial Chamber held that "sexual assault formed an integral part of the process of destroying the Tutsi ethnic group and that the rape was systematic and had been perpetrated against Tutsi women only, manifesting the specific intent required for those acts to constitute genocide."

Judge Navanethem Pillay, now the United Nations High Commissioner for Human Rights, said in a statement after the verdict: "From time immemorial, rape has been regarded as spoils of war. Now it will be considered a war crime. We want to send out a strong message that rape is no longer a trophy of war." An estimated 500,000 women were raped during the 1994 Rwandan genocide.

Professor Paul Walters in his April 2005 statement of support of her honorary doctorate of law at Rhodes University wrote:
Under her presidency of the Rwanda Tribunal, that body rendered a judgment against the mayor of Taba Commune which found him guilty of genocide for the use of rape in "the destruction of the spirit, of the will to live, and of life itself."

The Akayesu judgement includes the first interpretation and application by an international court of the 1948 Convention on the Prevention and Punishment of the Crime of Genocide. The Trial Chamber held that rape (which it defined as "a physical invasion of a sexual nature committed on a person under circumstances which are coercive") and sexual assault constitute acts of genocide insofar as they were committed with the intent to destroy, in whole or in part, a targeted group, as such. It found that sexual assault formed an integral part of the process of destroying the Tutsi ethnic group and that the rape was systematic and had been perpetrated against Tutsi women only, manifesting the specific intent required for those acts to constitute genocide.

In September 1999, the United Nations published a "Report of the International Criminal Tribunal for the Prosecution of Persons Responsible for Genocide and Other Serious Violations of International Humanitarian Law Committed in the Territory of Rwanda and Rwandan Citizens Responsible for Genocide and Other Such Violations Committed in the Territory of Neighboring States between 1 January and 31 December 1994". The report states that on 2 September 1998, Trial Chamber I of the International Criminal Tribunal for Rwanda, composed of Judges Laïty Kama, Presiding, Lennart Aspegren and Navanethem Pillay, found Jean Paul Akayesu guilty of 9 of the 15 counts proffered against him, including genocide, direct and public incitement to commit genocide and crimes against humanity, murder, torture, rape, and other inhumane acts. The Tribunal found Jean Paul Akayesu not guilty of the six remaining counts, including the count of complicity in genocide and the counts relating to violations of Common Article 3 to the Geneva Conventions and of Additional Protocol II thereto. On 2 October 1998, Jean Paul Akayesu was sentenced to life imprisonment for each of the nine counts, the sentences to run concurrently. Both Jean Paul Akayesu and the Prosecutor have appealed against the judgement rendered by the Trial Chamber.

International Criminal Tribunal for the Former Yugoslavia
Rape first became recognized as crime against humanity when the International Criminal Tribunal for the former Yugoslavia issued arrest warrants in 1993, based on the Geneva Conventions and Violations of the Laws or Customs of War. Specifically, it was recognized that Muslim women in Foča (southeastern Bosnia and Herzegovina) were subjected to systematic and widespread gang rape, torture and sexual enslavement by Bosnian Serb soldiers, policemen, and members of paramilitary groups after the takeover of the city (April 1992). The indictment was of major legal significance and was the first time that sexual assaults were investigated for the purpose of prosecution under the rubric of torture and enslavement as a crime against humanity. The indictment was confirmed by a 2001 verdict by the International Criminal Tribunal for the former Yugoslavia that rape and sexual enslavement are crimes against humanity. This ruling challenged the widespread acceptance of rape and sexual enslavement of women as intrinsic part of war. The International Criminal Tribunal for the former Yugoslavia found three Bosnian Serb men guilty of rape of Bosniak (Bosnian Muslim) women and girls (some as young as 12 and 15 years of age), in Foča, eastern Bosnia-Herzegovina. Furthermore, two of the men were found guilty of the crime against humanity of sexual enslavement for holding women and girls captive in a number of de facto detention centres. Many of the women subsequently disappeared. However, Justice Richard Goldstone, chief prosecutor at the International Criminal Tribunal for the former Yugoslavia, commented that "rape has never been the concern of the international community."

United States
United States law specifies that rape in wartime is punishable by death or imprisonment under Article 120 of the United States' Uniform Code of Military Justice and Section d(g) of the War Crimes Act of 1996. However, a total ban on abortion is a requirement of US humanitarian aid for war victims, with no exceptions for rape, incest, or to save the life of the mother.

Rome Statute
The 1998 Rome Statute Explanatory Memorandum, which defines the jurisdiction of the International Criminal Court, recognizes rape, sexual slavery, enforced prostitution, forced pregnancy, enforced sterilization, "or any other form of sexual violence of comparable gravity" as crime against humanity if the action is part of a widespread or systematic practice.

21st century

In 2008, the U.N. Security Council adopted resolution 1820, which noted that "rape and other forms of sexual violence can constitute war crimes, crimes against humanity or a constitutive act with respect to genocide".

The Office of the Special Representative of the Secretary-General on Sexual Violence in Conflict (SRSG-SVC) was established by Security Council Resolution 1888 (2009), one in a series of resolutions which recognized the detrimental impact that sexual violence in conflict has on communities, and acknowledged that this crime undermines efforts at peace and security and rebuilding once a conflict has ended.  The office serves as the United Nations' spokesperson and political advocate on conflict-related sexual violence, and is the chair of the network UN Action against Sexual Violence in Conflict.

In April 2010, the first Special Representative, Margot Wallström of Sweden, established the Office and served as the United Nations' spokesperson and political advocate on this issue.  In September 2012, Zainab Hawa Bangura of Sierra Leone took over as the Special Representative of the Secretary-General on Sexual Violence in Conflict.

The six priorities of the office are:
 to end impunity for sexual violence in conflict by assisting national authorities to strengthen criminal accountability, responsiveness to survivors and judicial capacity;
 the protection and empowerment of civilians who face sexual violence in conflict, in particular, women and girls who are targeted disproportionately by this crime;
 to mobilize political ownership by fostering government engagement in developing and implementing strategies to combat sexual violence;
 to increase recognition of rape as a tactic and consequence of war through awareness-raising activities at the international and country levels;
 to harmonise the UN's response by leading UN Action Against Sexual Violence in Conflict, a network of focal points from 13 UN agencies that amplify programming and advocacy on this issue in the wider UN agenda;
 to emphasize greater national ownership.
The Office has eight priority countries: Bosnia and Herzegovina; Central African Republic (CAR); Colombia; Côte d'Ivoire; Democratic Republic of Congo (DRC); Liberia; South Sudan and Sudan.  While six of the eight priority countries are in Africa, this problem is widespread and the Office of the Special Representative is engaged on this issue in Asia and the Pacific (in Cambodia for residual cases from the Khmer Rouge period) and the Middle East (Syria).

In 2013, the U.N. Security Council unanimously passed Resolution 2122, which supported abortion rights for girls and women raped in wars, "noting the need for access to the full range of sexual and reproductive health services, including regarding pregnancies resulting from rape, without discrimination." United Nations Secretary General Ban Ki-moon had recommended to the U.N. Security Council earlier in 2013 (in September) that girls and women raped in war should have access to "services for safe termination of pregnancies resulting from rape, without discrimination and in accordance with international human rights and humanitarian law." In March 2013, Ban Ki-moon had also recommended to the Council that women raped in war have access to abortion services.

History

Antiquity

Rape has accompanied warfare in virtually every known historical era. Women's historian Gerda Lerner writes,

The Greek and Roman armies reportedly engaged in war rape, which is documented by ancient authors such as Homer, Herodotus, Livy and Tacitus. Ancient sources held multiple, often contradictory attitudes to sexual violence in warfare. Haaretz writer and archaeologist Terry Madenholm explains, that for the Roman army, rape was more than just a weapon of terror; rape was regarded as the right of the victorious. Polybius describes Roman soldiers carrying out conquest rape, while Livy, portrays rape as synonymous with the capture of a city. Tacitus claims that Roman soldiers were seizing young Batavian boys who were deemed too young to join the army, yet old enough for homosexual intercourse during the Revolt of the Batavi.

According to medieval historians, the Huns and Avars, who invaded eastern Europe during Late Antiquity, harassed Wendish women and kept them in bondage as sex slaves:

During Late Antiquity, India also saw countless invasions by warriors from Central Asia such as the Kushans, Hephthalites, and the Hunas. The Huna invasions of the Indian subcontinent helped hasten the decline of the Gupta Empire. The Huna invaders conquered Kashmir, Punjab, and finally entered into the Ganges valley, in the very heart of India, slaughtering, pillaging, looting, burning, demolishing, and raping. Many cities in India were wiped out by the onslaught of the invaders; monasteries, temples, schools, and libraries were not spared, causing immense cultural destruction to the Indian subcontinent. Accounts are consistent that the Huna warriors practiced mass rapes of women in India.

Haaretz writer Terry Madenholm writes, that rape did not only serve as an instrument of sexual gratification or a tool for anger relief management; it symbolized revenge, subjugation and the enslavement of the defeated. Further, women and children were not the only victims of ancient wars. Rape of adult men remains one of the most closely kept secrets possibly because it was incompatible with the notion of masculinity; being sexually submissive as a man was considered utterly unmanly, even for the ancient writers. In the Graeco-Roman world a “true man” could play only an active role and those who were submissive were stigmatized.

Middle Ages
The Vikings were Scandinavians who raided and colonized wide areas of Europe from the late 8th century to the early 11th century. Viking settlements in Britain and Ireland are thought to have been primarily male enterprises, with a lesser role for female Vikings.  British Isles' women are mentioned in old texts on the founding of Iceland, indicating that the Viking explorers had acquired wives and concubines from Britain and Ireland. Some historians dispute the Vikings' "rape and pillage" image, arguing that exaggeration and distortion in later medieval texts created an image of treacherous and brutal Northmen.

Female slavery was common during the medieval Arab slave trade, where prisoners of war captured in battle from non-Arab lands sometimes ended up as concubine slaves in the Arab World. Most of these slaves came from places such as Sub-Saharan Africa (mainly Zanj), the Caucasus (mainly Circassians), and Central Asia (mainly Tartars). 

Before the Jurchens overthrew the Khitan, married Jurchen women and Jurchen girls were raped by Liao Khitan envoys as a custom which caused resentment by the Jurchens against the Khitan. Song princesses committed suicide to avoid rape or were killed for resisting rape by the Jin.

The Mongols, who established the Mongol Empire across much of Eurasia, caused much destruction during their invasions. Documents written during or after Genghis Khan's reign say that after a conquest, the Mongol soldiers looted, pillaged and raped. Some troops who submitted were incorporated into the Mongol system in order to expand their manpower. These techniques were sometimes used to spread terror and warning to others.

In 1302, the Mamluk army of Kipchak Turk Bahri Mamluk Sultan Al-Nasir Muhammad crushed a Bedouin rebellion in Upper Egypt and "slew mercilessly every Bedouin in the land and carried off their women captive". G. W. Murray said that "This drastic solution of the Bedouin question removed the pure Arab descendants of the Conquerors from the scene and so enabled the Beja to preserve themselves as an African race practically uninfluenced by Arab blood, while leaving the desert edges of Upper Egypt free for settlement by the Western Bedouin." The army was led by the Oirat Mongol Mamluk Sayf ad-Din Salar and Circassian Mamluk al-Baibars al-Jashnakir (Beibars).

During Timur's invasion of Syria, in the 1400 Sack of Aleppo, Ibn Taghribirdi wrote that Timur's Tatar soldiers committed mass rape on the native women of Aleppo, massacring their children and forcing the brothers and fathers of the women to watch the gang rapes which took place in the mosques. Ibn Taghribirdi said the Tatars killed all children while tying the women with ropes in Aleppo's Great mosque after the children and women tried to take refuge in the mosque. Tatar soldiers openly raped gentlewomen and virgins in public in both the small mosques and the Great Mosque. The brothers and fathers of the women were being tortured while forced to watch their female relatives get raped. The corpses in the streets and mosques resulted in stink permeating Aleppo. The women were kept naked while being gang raped repeatedly by different men. Ibn Arabshah witnessed the slaughters and rapes Timur's Tatar soldiers carried out. Mass rapes were also recorded in Timur's 1401 Sack of Damascus.

Early modern period

Conquest of the Americas
Spanish conquistadors kidnapped and raped Native American women and children.

Eighty Years' War 
During the second half of the Eighty Years' War, Brabantian towns such as Helmond, Eindhoven and Oisterwijk were repeatedly subjected to pillaging, arson, and rape committed by both the rebel Dutch States Army and the royal Spanish Army of Flanders.

Thirty Years' War
During the Sack of Magdeburg, many Imperial soldiers supposedly went out of control. The invading soldiers had not received payment for their service and demanded valuables from every household they encountered. There were reports of gang rapes of minors and torture.

Wars of the Three Kingdoms
A significant number of women were gang-raped by Royalist and Irish Confederate troops under General Montrose who sacked Aberdeen in Scotland in 1644.

Second Manchu invasion of Korea

In the Second Manchu invasion of Korea when Qing forces invaded the Korean Kingdom of Joseon, many Korean women were subjected to rape at the hands of the Qing forces, and as a result they were unwelcomed by their families even if they were released by the Qing after being ransomed.

Manchu invasion of Xinjiang
The Ush rebellion in 1765 by Uyghur Muslims against the Manchus of the Qing dynasty occurred after Uyghur women were gang raped by the servants and son of Manchu official Su-cheng. It was said that Ush Muslims had long wanted to sleep on [Sucheng and son's] hides and eat their flesh. because of the rape of Uyghur Muslim women for months by the Manchu official Sucheng and his son. The Manchu Emperor ordered that the Uyghur rebel town be massacred, the Qing forces enslaved all the Uyghur children and women and slaughtered the Uyghur men. Manchu soldiers and Manchu officials regularly having sex with or raping Uyghur women caused massive hatred and anger by Uyghur Muslims to Manchu rule. The invasion by Jahangir Khoja was preceded by another Manchu official, Binjing who raped a Muslim daughter of the Kokan aqsaqal from 1818 to 1820. The Qing sought to cover up the rape of Uyghur women by Manchus to prevent anger against their rule from spreading among the Uyghurs.

Dutch Formosa
Multiple Taiwanese Aboriginal villages in frontier areas rebelled against the Dutch in the 1650s due to acts of oppression, such as when the Dutch ordered that aboriginal women be turned over to them for sex, and when they demanded that deer pelts and rice be given to them by aborigines in the Taipei basin in Wu-lao-wan village, sparking a rebellion in December 1652. Two Dutch translators were beheaded by the Wu-lao-wan aborigines and in a subsequent fight 30 aboriginals and two additional Dutch people died, after an embargo of salt and iron on Wu-lao-wan. The aboriginals were forced to sue for peace in February 1653.

Dutch women were kept as sexual slaves by the Chinese after the Dutch were expelled from Taiwan in 1662. During the 1662 Siege of Fort Zeelandia in which Chinese Ming loyalist forces commanded by Koxinga besieged and defeated the Dutch East India Company and conquered Taiwan, the Chinese took Dutch women and children prisoner. The Dutch missionary Antonius Hambroek, two of his daughters, and his wife were among the Dutch prisoners of war who were being held captive by Koxinga. Koxinga sent Hambroek to Fort Zeelandia demanding that he persuade them to surrender or else Hambroek would be killed when he returned. Hambroek returned to the Fort, where two of his other daughters were being held prisoner. He urged the commander of the Fort not to surrender, and returned to Koxinga's camp. He was then executed by decapitation, and in addition to this, a rumor was spread among the Chinese that the Dutch were encouraging the native Taiwanese aboriginals to kill Chinese, so Koxinga ordered the mass execution of Dutch male prisoners in retaliation, in addition to a few women and children who were also being held prisoner.

The surviving Dutch women and children were then enslaved, with the Dutch women being sold eventually to Chinese soldiers to become their wives, after Koxinga's commanders had thoroughly used them for their own sexual pleasures. The daily journal of the Dutch fort is the primary source for what happened next: "the best were preserved for the use of the commanders, and then sold to the common soldiers. Happy was she that fell to the lot of an unmarried man, being thereby freed from vexations by the Chinese women, who are very jealous of their husbands." Koxinga himself took as his concubine Hambroek's teenage daughter, a girl described by the Dutch commander Caeuw as "a very sweet and pleasing maiden".

As late as 1684 some of these Dutch women were still being held captive as wives or slave concubines by the Chinese. In Quemoy a Dutch merchant was contacted and an arrangement to release the prisoners was proposed by a son of Koxinga, but it came to nothing.

Memory of the fate of the Dutch women and of Hambroek's daughter has been kept alive through the subsequent historiography of the period, whence it has stoked various dramatised and fictionalised retellings of the story. The topic of the Chinese forcibly taking the Dutch women and the daughter of Antonius Hambroek as concubines was featured in Joannes Nomsz's play which became famous and well known in Europe and revealed European anxieties about the fate of the Dutch women. The title of the play was "Antonius Hambroek, of de Belegering van Formoza" rendered in English as "Antonius Hambroek, or the Siege of Formosa".

Russian invasion of the Amur

Cattle and horses in the hundreds were looted and 243 ethnic Daur Mongolic girls and women were raped by Russian Cossacks under Yerofey Khabarov when he invaded the Amur river basin in the 1650s. The Albazinians were told to marry Solon Evenki widows by the Board of Rites. Mongol and Manchu women were married by the Albazinians. The wives married by the Albazinians were former jailed convicts.

Four Days of Ghent 
During the Four Days of Ghent (13–16 November 1789), part of the Brabant Revolution, Patriot rebels tried to capture the city of Ghent from a weak Imperial Army garrison, which sought to retain the Austrian Netherlands for the Habsburg Monarchy. After the first day of fighting was over, and the night fell, plundering started. Primarily the Imperial troops, most notably the "Clerfayt" Regiment, badly misbehaved by robbing, raping and killing about. Both Imperial and Patriot sources report an astonishing lack of discipline amongst the Imperial soldiers, and that their crimes committed against civilians at the early stages of combat was a crucial factor in motivating the civilian population of Ghent to side with the rebels.

Ottoman-Saudi War
The historian Abd al-Rahman al-Jabarti recorded in his history, "The Marvelous Compositions of Biographies and Events" (‘Aja’ib al-athar fi’l-tarajim wa’l-akhbar) that Ottoman forces in the Ottoman-Saudi War took Wahhabi Saudi women and girls as slaves, despite them being Muslim and enslavement of Muslims being illegal. The jihadist Islamist Saudi Nasir al-Fahd mentioned the Ottoman enslavement of Saudi women and girls in his book attacking the Ottomans, al-dawla al-uthmaniyya wa mawqif da‘wat al-shaykh muhammad bin ‘abd al-wahhab minha [The Ottoman State and the Position of the Call of Sheikh Muhammad ibn Abd al-Wahhab on it], published in 1993.

Circassian genocide
Cossacks raped Muslim Circassian women and had children with them. Circassian children were scared of Grigory Zass and he was called the devil (Iblis) by the Circassians.

Russians raped Circassian girls during the 1877 Russo-Turkish war from the Circassian refugees who were settled in the Ottoman Balkans. Circassians also raped and murdered Bulgarians during the 1877 Russo-Turkish war.

Indian Rebellion of 1857

During the Indian Rebellion of 1857, known as "India's First War of Independence" to the Indians and as the "Sepoy Mutiny" to the British, Indian sepoys rebelled en masse against the East India Company's rule over India. Incidents of rape committed by Indian sepoys against British women and children were reported in the English press, particularly after British civilians fell into Indian hands after sieges such as at Cawnpore. However, after the rebellion was suppressed, detailed analyses by the British government concluded that although Indian sepoys had engaged in massacres of British civilians after they captured them, there had never been one single instance of war rape committed by the sepoys. One such account published by The Times, regarding an incident where 48 British girls as young as fourteen and ten had been raped by the Indian sepoys in Delhi, was criticised as an obvious fabrication by Karl Marx, who pointed out that the story was written by a clergyman in Bangalore, while the rebellion was mostly confined to the Punjab region.

As British troops suppressed the rebellion, angered by reports of massacres and rapes of British civilians, reprisals were often carried out against Indian civilians, particularly at Cawnpore. Indian women were often a target of rape by the enraged soldiers.

Taiping Rebellion
The Ever Victorious Army which defeated the Taiping Rebellion in Qing China gained notoriety among the Chinese populace for frequently looting villages and raping women they came across, but their commander Charles Gordon did attempt to control them, executing men accused of looting or rape.

Boxer Rebellion

During the Boxer Rebellion, the Yihetuan committed several massacres of foreign civilians (motivated by their anti-Christian and anti-Western sentiment) but were said to avoid raping women.

The majority population of the hundreds of thousands of people living in the inner "Tartar" city of Beijing during the Qing were Manchus and Mongol bannermen from the Eight Banners after they were moved there in 1644. During the Boxer Rebellion in 1900, western and Japanese soldiers mass raped Manchu women and Mongol banner women.

Indeed, it appeared common practise for the invading soldiers to capture women, regardless of class or creed, to rape them. This was done by forcing them to work as sex slaves in rape-manors they had established in the Beijing hutongs (alleys formed by siheyuan residences). This excerpt from the "Miscellaneous Notes about the Boxers", written by Japanese journalist Sawara Tokusuke, describes one such rape-manor:

"The Allied forces would frequently capture women, no matter virtuous, wretched, old or young, and would, as much as they could, displace them to Biaobei alleys and to live in row houses there as prostitutes for the soldiery. The West end of this alley the path would have been blocked off, in order to prevent escape, the East end was the only way in or out. This way was guarded. Any person from the Allied forces could enter for pleasure and rape to his heart's desire." (Sawara 268)

Sawara also reports on the seven daughters of the Manchu bannerman Yulu 裕禄 of the Hitara clan, the Viceroy of the province of Zhili (present day Hebei). Yulu was on good terms with the invaders. He was a man who always sought to create good impressions, and due to this, the British Consul at Tianjin offered him asylum on board of one of Her Majesty's ships for his loyalty to the British (Fleming 84). Later in the war Yulu perished in the battle for Yangcun. When Beijing fell, the Allies abducted all seven of his daughters and then sent them to the Heavenly Palace in Beijing where they were violated repeatedly. Then they were held captive as sex slaves for the soldiers in one of the rape-manors mentioned above (Sawara 268).

Another story relays the fate that befell the women of Chongqi's household. Chongqi 崇绮 was a nobleman from the Mongolian Alute clan and scholar of high standing in the Imperial Manchu court. He was also the father-in-law of the previous Emperor. His wife and one of his daughters, much like Yulu's daughters, were captured by the invading soldiers. They were taken to the Heavenly Temple, held captive and were then brutally raped by dozens of Eight Nations Alliance soldiers during the entire course of the Beijing occupation. Only after the Eight Nations Alliance's retreat did the mother and daughter return home, only to hang themselves from the rafters. Upon this discovery, Chongqi, out of despair, soon followed suit (Sawara 266). He hanged himself on 26 August 1900. His son, Baochu, and many other family members committed suicide shortly after (Fang 75).

Many Manchu Bannermen in Beijing supported the Boxers in the Boxer Rebellion and shared their anti-foreign sentiment. The Manchu Bannermen were devastated by the fighting during the First Sino-Japanese War and the Boxer Rebellion, sustaining massive casualties during the wars and subsequently being driven into extreme suffering and hardship. The forces of the Eight-Nation Alliance, upon their capture of Peking, went on violent rampages against Manchu civilians, looting, raping, and murdering numerous civilians they came across. The number of women who committed suicide numbered in the thousands. A western Journalist, George Lynch, said "there are things that I must not write, and that may not be printed in Great Britain, which would seem to show that this Western civilization of ours is merely a veneer over savagery." All of the eight nations in the alliance engaged in looting and war rape. Luella Miner wrote that the behavior of the Russian and French was particularly appalling. Qing women and girls killed themselves in order to avoid being raped. The French commander dismissed the rapes, attributing them to the "gallantry of the French soldiers".

Manchu property including horses and cattle were looted while their villages were burnt by the Russian Cossacks as Manchus were driven out as refugees and slaughtered by Russian cossacks according to S. M. Shirokogoroff when he was in Heilongjiang along the Amur river garrison of Heihe (Aihun). Manchu banner garrisons were annihilated on 5 roads by Russians as they suffered most of the casualties. Manchu Shoufu killed himself during the battle of Peking and the Manchu Lao She's father was killed by western soldiers in the battle as the Manchu banner armies of the Center Division of the Guards Army, Tiger Spirit Division and Peking Field force in the Metropolitan banners were slaughtered by the western soldiers. Baron von Ketteler, the German diplomat was murdered by Captain Enhai, a Manchu from the Tiger Spirit Division of Aisin Gioro Zaiyi, Prince Duan and the Inner city Legation Quarters and Catholic cathedral were both attacked by Manchu bannermen. Manchu bannermen were slaughtered by the Eight Nation Alliance all over Manchuria and Beijing because most of the Manchu bannermen supported the Boxers in the Boxer rebellion. The clan system of the Manchus in Aigun was obliterated by the despoliation of the area at the hands of the Russian invaders.

German South-West Africa
In German South-West Africa during the Herero rebellion against German rule (and the subsequent Herero and Namaqua Genocide), German soldiers regularly engaged in gang rapes before killing the women or leaving them in the desert to die; a number of Herero women were also forced into involuntary prostitution.

Xinhai revolution 

In October 1911, during the Xinhai revolution, revolutionaries stormed the Manchu quarter of Xi'an. Most of the city's 20,000 Manchus were killed. The Hui Muslim community was divided in its support for the revolution. The Hui Muslims of Shaanxi supported the revolutionaries, while the Hui Muslims of Gansu supported the Qing. The native Hui Muslims (Mohammedans) of Xi'an (Shaanxi province) joined the Han Chinese revolutionaries in slaughtering the Manchus. Some wealthy Manchus survived by being ransomed. Wealthy Han Chinese enslaved Manchu girls and poor Han Chinese troops seized young Manchu women as wives. Hui Muslims also seized young pretty Manchu girls and raised them as Muslims.

A British missionary who witnessed the massacre commented that "Old and young, men and women, children alike, were all butchered... Houses were plundered and then burnt; those who would fain have laid hidden till the storm was past, were forced to come out into the open. The revolutionaries, protected by a parapet of the wall, poured a heavy, unceasing, relentless fire into the doomed Tartar (Manchu) city, those who tried to escape thence into the Chinese city were cut down as they emerged from the gates."

World War I

Rapes were allegedly committed during the German advance through Belgium in the first months of the war. After the war, the historian Harold D. Lasswell dismissed the rape allegations as propaganda in his 1927 Freudian-oriented study, "Propaganda Technique in the World War". In September 1914, the French government set up a commission, that was also seen in Belgium to investigate reports of rape committed by German soldiers, however as historian Ruth Harris has documented the investigations were more to fuel narratives of nationalism and cultural hatred towards Germany. The individual stories of the women that were impacted were used to justify the war and to market it to the civilians.

Armenian Genocide 

Rape was widespread during the Armenian Genocide which was committed by the Ottoman Turks. During the death marches of Armenian civilians through Anatolia in 1915, Turkish soldiers frequently raped and killed Armenian women and children. In many cases, Turkish civilians also participated in these crimes.

World War II

The sometimes widespread and systematic occurrence of war rape of women by soldiers has been documented. During World War II and in its immediate aftermath, war rape occurred in a range of situations, ranging from institutionalized sexual slavery to war rapes associated with specific battles.

Asia

Imperial Japanese Army

The term "comfort women" is a euphemism for the estimated 200,000, mostly Korean, Chinese, Vietnamese, Burmese, Japanese, Taiwanese and Filipino women who were forced to serve as sex slaves in Japanese military brothels during World War II.

In the Nanking Massacre, Japanese soldiers sexually assaulted Chinese women who were trapped in the city of Nanjing when it fell to the Japanese on 13 December 1937. The International Military Tribunal for the Far East estimated that 20,000 women, children, were raped or otherwise sexually assaulted during the occupation. Iris Chang estimated that the number of Chinese women raped by Japanese soldiers ranged from 20,000 to 80,000. Chuo University professor Yoshiaki Yoshimi states there were about 2,000 centers where as many as 200,000 Japanese, Chinese, Korean, Filipino, Taiwanese, Burmese, Indonesian, Timorese, Papuan, Micronesian, Dutch and Australian women were interned and used as sex slaves.

It was reported in 1905 that many Russian women were raped by Japanese troops causing widespread venereal disease in many Japanese troops.  Hal Gold estimated there were 20,000 recorded incidents of rape against Russian women.

An unknown number of white females and children were  either raped or sexually assaulted at various locations such as Banoeng, Padang, Tarakan, Menado, Flores island and Blora, at the beginning of the Japanese initial invasion and occupation. There were 150,000 interned European males, females and children throughout Indonesia as prisoners or civilian internees.  In the Bangka Island, most of the Australian nurses captured were raped before they were murdered.

J.F. van Wagtendonk and the Dutch Broadcast Foundation estimated a total number of 400 Dutch girls were taken from the camps to become comfort women.

Melanesian women from New Guinea were also used as comfort women. Local women were recruited from Rabaul as comfort women, along with a small number of mixed Japanese-Papuan women born to Japanese fathers and Papuan mothers. Some Micronesian women were also comfort women from island of Truk in the Carolines, around 100 women, (most of them 'Comfort Women' girls forced into prostitution by the Japanese Army).

During WWII, the Japanese army used more than 120,000 Tamils in the construction of 415 km railway between Siam and Burma to transport them army supplies. During this project, it was initially believed that half of them (around 60,000) perished.

However, recent research revealed that about 150,000+ Tamil Indians were killed during the duration of the Siam railway project. They fell victim to snake bites and insect bites, diseases like cholera, malaria & beriberi, massacre, torture, rape, committed suicide, etc. as they were unable to bear the burden.

Other methods of executing the Indian Tamils included burning them and their entire families to death. Japanese officers would also invite female Indian coolies to dance naked where they were raped afterward. The Japanese officials who finished gang raping numerous Indian women at a Japanese party was so violent that one Indian woman was raped to death as a result. One 19-year-old Tamil Indian was raped by a Japanese soldier who later forced other Tamil coolies to rape her as a joke. She later died after being defiled by bamboo strips.

In Hanoi on 15–20 April 1945 the Tonkin Revolutionary Military Conference of the Viet Minh issued a resolution that was reprinted on pages 1–4 on 25 August 1970 in the Nhan Dan journal. It called for a general uprising, resistance and guerilla warfare against the Japanese by establishing 7 war zones across Vietnam named after past heroes of Vietnam, calling for propaganda to explain to the people that their only way forward was violent resistance against the Japanese and exposing the Vietnamese puppet government that served them. The conference also called for training propagandists and having women spread military propaganda and target Japanese soldiers with Chinese language leaflets and Japanese language propaganda. The Viet Minh's Vietnamese Liberation Army published the "Resistance against Japan" (Khang Nhat) newspaper. They also called for the creation of a group called "Chinese and Vietnamese Allied against Japan" by sending leaflets to recruit overseas Chinese in Vietnam to their cause.  The resolution called on forcing French in Vietnam to recognize Vietnamese independence and for the DeGaulle France (Allied French) to recognize their independent and cooperate with them against Japan.

On 17 August 1970, the North Vietnamese National Assembly Chairman Truong Chinh reprinted an article in Vietnamese in Nhan Dan, published in Hanoi titled "Policy of the Japanese Pirates Towards Our People" which was a reprint of his original article written in August 1945 in No 3 of the "Communist Magazine" (Tap Chi Cong San) with the same title, describing Japanese atrocities like looting, slaughter and rape against the people of north Vietnam in 1945. He denounced the Japanese claims to have liberated Vietnam from France with the Greater East Asia Co-prosperity Sphere announced by Tojo and mentioned how the Japanese looted shrines, temples, eggs, vegetables, straw, rice, chickens, hogs and cattle for their horses and soldiers and built military stations and airstrips after stealing land and taking boats, vehicles, homes and destroying cotton fields and vegetable fields for peanut and jute cultivation in Annam and Tonkin. Japan replaced the French government on 9 March 1945 and started openly looting the Vietnamese even more in addition to taking French owned properties and stole watches, pencils, bicycles, money and clothing in Bac Giang and Bac Can. The Japanese tried to play the Vietnamese against the French and play the Laotians against the Vietnamese by inciting Lao people to killed Vietnamese as Lao murdered 7 Vietnamese officials in Luang Prabang and Lao youths were recruited to an anti-Vietnam organization by the Japanese when they took over Luang Prabang. The Japanese spread false rumours that the French were massacring Vietnamese at the time to distract the Vietnamese from Japanese atrocities. The Japanese created groups to counter the Viet Minh Communists like Vietnam Pao ve doan (Vietnam protection group) and Vietnam Ai quoc doan (Vietnam Patriotic Group to force Vietnamese into coolie labour, take taxes and rice and arrested ant-Japanese Vietnamese with their puppet government run by Tran Trong Kim. The Viet Minh rejected the Japanese demands to cease fighting and support Japan, so the Japanese implemented the Three Alls policy (San Kuang) against the Vietnamese, pillaging, burning, killing, looting, and raping Vietnamese women. The Vietnamese called the Japanese "dwarfed monsters" (Wa (Japan)) and the Japanese committed these atrocities in Thai Nguyen province at Dinh Hoa, Vo Nhai and Hung Son. The Japanese attacked the Vietnamese while masquerading as Viet Minh and used terror and deception. The Japanese created the puppet Vietnam Phuc quoc quan (Vietnam restoration army). and tried to disrupt the Viet Minh's redistribution and confiscation of property of pro-Japanese Vietnamese traitors by disguising themselves as Viet Minh and then attacking people who took letters from them and organizing anti-French rallies and Trung sisters celebrations. Japanese soldiers tried to infiltrate Viet Minh bases with Viet Minh flags and brown trousers during their fighting. The Japanese murdered, plundered and raped Vietnamese and beheaded Vietnamese who stole bread and corn  while they were starving according to their martial law. They shot a Vietnamese pharmacy student to death outside of his own house when he was coming home from guard duty at a hospital after midnight in Hanoi and also shot a defendant for a political case in the same city. In Thai Nguyen province, Vo Nhai, a Vietnamese boat builder was thrown in a river and had his stomach stabbed by the Japanese under suspicion of helping Viet Minh guerillas. The Japanese slit the abdomen and hung the Dai Tu mayor upside down in Thai Nguyen as well. The Japanese also beat thousands of people in Hanoi for not cooperating. Japanese officers ordered their soldiers to behead and burn Vietnamese. Some claimed that Taiwanese and Manchurian soldiers in the Japanese army were participating in the atrocities against the Vietnamese but Truong Chinh said that even if it was true Taiwanese and Manchurian soldiers were committing the rapes and killing, their Japanese officers were the ones giving the orders and participating along with them. Truong Chinh said that the Japanese wanted to plunder Asians for their own market and take it from the United States and Great Britain and were imperialists with no intent on liberating Vietnam.

Truong Chinh wrote another article on 12 September 1945, No 16 in Liberation Banner (Co Giai Phong) which was also reprinted on 16 August 1970 in Nhan Dan.  He commemorated the August revolution against the Japanese, after the Japanese surrendered on 15 August 1945 then the Viet Minh started attacking and slaughtering Japanese and disarming them in a nationwide rebellion on 19 August 1945. The Japanese had already disarmed the French and the Japanese themselves lost morale so the Viet Minh managed to seize control after attacking the Japanese. Viet Minh had begun fighting in 1944, when the French were attacked on Dinh Ca in October 1944 and in Cao Bang and Bac Can French were attacked by Viet Cong in November 1944 and the French and Japanese fought each other on 9 March 1945, so in Tonkin the Viet Cong began disarming French soldiers and attacking the Japanese.  In Quang Ngai, Ba To, Yen Bai and Nghia Lo political prisoners escaped Japanese were attake din Son La by Meo (Hmong) tribesmen and in Hoa Binh and Lang Son by Muong tribesmen.  Viet Minh took control of 6 provinces in Tonkin after 9 March 1945 within 2 weeks. The Viet Minh led a brutal campaign against the Japanese where many died from 9 March 1945 to 19 August 1945. Truong Chinh ended the article with a quote from Sun Yatsen, "The revolution is not yet won, All comrades must continue their al out efforts!"

On 26 September 1945 Ho Chi Minh wrote a letter calling for struggle against the French mentioning they were returning after they sold out the Vietnamese to the Japanese twice in 4 years.

An economic studies journal in North Vietnam, Nghien Cuu Kinh Te, on pages 60,-80 of issue No. 57  published an article accusing Japan of neocolonial economic policies trying to dominate Southeast Asia by exporting products and importing raw materials and that it was economically taking over Southeast Asia after the US after World War II, accusing Japan of doing it in Hong Kong, India, Pakistan, Indonesia, Malaysia, Singapore, Philippines, Thailand, South Vietnam, Taiwan and South Korea. The North Vietnamese warned Asians they had to "increase their vigilance over every activity of the Japanese financial magnates, increase their struggle against Japan's policies of economic aggression and promptly block its aggressive plots."  in order to "clip the wings" of US imperialism. The article denounced the US Japanese alliance and Japanese neocolonialism and urged that anti-imperialists and socialists disrupt them in Japan.

The Japanese forced Vietnamese women to become comfort women and with Burmese, Indonesia, Thai and Filipino women they made up a notable portion of Asian comfort women in general. Japanese use of Malaysian and Vietnamese women as comfort women was corroborated by testimonies. There were comfort women stations in Malaysia, Indonesia, Philippines, Burma, Thailand, Cambodia, Vietnam, North Korea and South Korea. A Korean comfort woman named Kim Ch'un-hui stayed behind in Vietnam and died there when she was 44 in 1963, owning a dairy farm, cafe, US cash and diamonds worth 200,000 US dollars. 1 million Vietnamese were starved to death during World War II according to Thomas U. Berger. 2 billion US dollars worth (1945 values) of damage, 148 million dollars of them due to destruction of industrial plants was incurred by Vietnam. 90% of heavy vehicles and motorcycles, cars and 16 tons of junks as well as railways, port installations were destroyed as well as one third of bridges. Some Japanese soldiers married Vietnamese women like Nguyen Thi Xuan and Nguyen Thi Thu and fathered multiple children with the Vietnamese women who remained behind in Vietnam while the Japanese soldiers themselves returned to Japan in 1955. The official Vietnamese historical narrative view them as children of rape and prostitution.

In the Vietnamese Famine of 1945 1 to 2 million Vietnamese starved to death in the Red river delta of northern Vietnam due to the Japanese, as the Japanese seized Vietnamese rice and didn't pay. In Phat Diem the Vietnamese farmer Di Ho was one of the few survivors who saw the Japanese steal grain. The North Vietnamese government accused both France and Japan of the famine and said 1-2 million Vietnamese died. Võ An Ninh took photographs of dead and dying Vietnamese during the great famine.
On 25 March 2000, the Vietnamese journalist Trần Khuê wrote an article "Dân chủ: Vấn đề của dân tộc và thời đại" where he harshly criticized ethnographers and historians in Ho Chin Minh city's Institute of Social Sciences like Dr. Đinh Văn Liên and Professor Mạc Đường who tried to whitewash Japan's atrocities against the Vietnamese by portraying Japan's aid to the South Vietnamese regime against North Vietnam as humanitarian aid, portraying the Vietnam war against America as a civil war. changing the death toll of 2 million Vietnamese dead at the hands of the Japanese famine to 1 million and calling the Japanese invasion as a presence and calling Japanese fascists at simply Japanese at the Vietnam-Japan international conference. He accused them of changing history in exchange for only a few tens of thousands of dollars, and the Presidium of international Vietnamese studies in Hanoi did not include any Vietnamese women. The Vietnamese professor Văn Tạo and Japanese professor Furuta Moto both conducted a study in the field on the Japanese induced famine of 1945 admitting that Japan killed 2 million Vietnamese by starvation.

French Army
Vietnamese civilians were robbed, raped and killed by French soldiers in Saigon when they came back in August 1945. Vietnamese women were also raped in north Vietnam by the French like in Bảo Hà, Bảo Yên District, Lào Cai province and Phu Lu, which caused 400 Vietnamese who were trained by the French to defect on 20 June 1948. Buddhist statues were looted and Vietnamese were robbed, raped and tortured by the French after the French crushed the Viet Minh in northern Vietnam in 194-1948 forcing the Viet Minh to flee into Yunnan, China for sanctuary and aid from the Chinese Communists. A French reporter was told "We know what war always is, We understand your soldiers taking our animals, our jewelry, our Buddhas; it is normal. We are resigned to their raping out wives and our daughters; war has always been like that. But we object to being treated in the same way, not only our sons, but ourselves, old men and dignitaries that we are." by Vietnamese village notables. Vietnamese rape victims became "half insane".

Australian Army
"A former prostitute recalled that as soon as Australian troops arrived in Kure in early 1946, they 'dragged young women into their jeeps, took them to the mountain, and then raped them. I heard them screaming for help nearly every night'."

United States Army
A large number of rapes were committed by U.S. forces during the Battle of Okinawa in 1945. The Judge Advocate General's office reports that there were 971 convictions for rape in the U.S. military from January 1942 to June 1947, which includes a portion of the occupation.

Okinawan historian Oshiro Masayasu (former director of the Okinawa Prefectural Historical Archives) writes:

According to Toshiyuki Tanaka, 76 cases of rape or rape-murder were reported during the first five years of the American occupation of Okinawa. However, he asserts this is probably not the true figure, as most cases were unreported.

When the Japanese surrendered, they anticipated that widespread rapes would occur during the following occupation and made rapid efforts to set up brothels to curb this.

Despite this precaution, 1,336 rapes reportedly occurred during the first 10 days of the occupation of Kanagawa prefecture, although a similar figure has also been given for the whole of Japan.

Individual instances of rape by members of the United States Army in Japan were reported while their forces were stationed in post-war Japan, such as the Yumiko-chan incident and the 1995 Okinawa rape incident.

Some historians state that mass rapes took place during the initial phase of the occupation. For instance, Fujime Yuki has stated that 3,500 rapes occurred in the first month after American troops landed. Tanaka relates that in Yokohama, the capital of the prefecture, there were 119 known rapes in September 1945. At least seven academic books and many other works state that there were 1,336 reported rapes during the first 10 days of the occupation of Kanagawa Prefecture. Walsh states that this figure originated from Yuki Tanaka's book Hidden Horrors, and resulted from that author misreading the crime figures in their source. The source states that the Japanese Government recorded 1,326 criminal incidents of all types involving American forces, of which an unspecified number were rapes.

Soviet Army
During the Soviet invasion of Manchuria, Soviet and Mongolian soldiers attacked and raped Japanese civilians, often encouraged by the local Chinese population who were resentful of Japanese rule. The local Chinese population sometimes even joined in these attacks against the Japanese population with the Soviet soldiers. In one famous example, during the Gegenmiao massacre, Soviet soldiers, encouraged by the local Chinese population, raped and massacred over one thousand Japanese women and children. Property of the Japanese were also looted by the Soviet soldiers and Chinese. Many Japanese women married themselves to local Manchurian men to protect themselves from persecution by Soviet soldiers. These Japanese women mostly married Chinese men and became known as "stranded war wives" (zanryu fujin).

According to British and American reports, Soviet Red Army troops also looted and terrorized the local people of Mukden located in Manchuria. A foreigner witnessed Soviet troops, formerly stationed in Berlin, who were allowed by the Soviet military to go into the city of Mukden "for three days of rape and pillage". The Soviet Army's reputation in the region was affected for years to come.

Konstantin Asmolov of the Center for Korean Research of the Russian Academy of Sciences dismisses Western accounts of Soviet violence against civilians in the Far East as exaggeration and rumor and contends that accusations of mass crimes by the Red Army inappropriately extrapolate isolated incidents regarding the nearly 2,000,000 Soviet troops in the Far East into mass crimes. According to him, such accusations are refuted by the documents of the time, from which it is clear that such crimes were far less of a problem than in Germany. Asmolov further asserts that the Soviets prosecuted their perpetrators while prosecution of German and Japanese "rapists and looters" in WWII was virtually unknown.

Europe

British Army
Italian statistics record eight rapes and nineteen attempted rapes by British soldiers in Italy between September 1943 and December 1945, during and after the invasion of Sicily. Although far from the scale of those committed by the Wehrmacht or Red Army, rapes of local women and girls were committed by British troops during the last months of World War II in Germany. Though a high priority for the Royal Military Police, some commanders proved reluctant to prosecute their men. There were also reports of sexual assault committed by British soldiers in liberated Belgium and the Netherlands, and a number of men were convicted of these crimes while they were fraternizing with Dutch and Belgian families during the winter of 1944–45.

Wehrmacht

Rapes were committed by Wehrmacht forces on Jewish women and girls during the Invasion of Poland in September 1939; they were also committed against Polish, Ukrainian, Belarusian and Russian women and girls during mass executions which were primarily carried out by the Selbstschutz units, with the assistance of Wehrmacht soldiers who were stationed in territory that was under the administration of the German military; the rapes were committed against female captives before they were shot. Only one case of rape was prosecuted by a German court during the military campaign in Poland, and even then the German judge found the perpetrator guilty of Rassenschande (committing a shameful act against his race as defined by the racial policy of Nazi Germany), rather than rape. Jewish women were particularly vulnerable to rape during The Holocaust.

Rapes were also committed by German forces stationed on the Eastern Front, where they were largely unpunished (as opposed to rapes committed in Western Europe); the overall number of rapes is difficult to establish due to the lack of prosecutions of the crime by German courts. Wehrmacht also established a system of military brothels, in which young women and girls from occupied territories were forced into prostitution under harsh conditions. In the Soviet Union women were kidnapped by German forces for prostitution as well; one report by the International Military Tribunal writes "in the city of Smolensk the German Command opened a brothel for officers in one of the hotels into which hundreds of women and girls were driven; they were mercilessly dragged down the street by their arms and hair."

French Colonial Army

French Moroccan troops, known as Goumiers, committed rapes and other war crimes in Italy after the Battle of Monte Cassino and in Germany. In Italy, the mass rapes committed after the Battle of Monte Cassino by Goumiers, colonial troops of the French Expeditionary Corps, are known as Marocchinate. According to Italian sources, more than 7,000 Italian civilians, including women and children, were raped by Goumiers.

French Senegalese troops too, known as Senegalese Tirailleurs, who landed on the island of Elba on 17 June 1944, were responsible for mass rapes, though their behaviour was considered less brutal than that of the French North African troops in continental Italy.

US Army

Secret wartime files made public in 2006 reveal that American GIs committed at least 400 sexual offenses in Europe, including 126 rapes in the United Kingdom, between 1942 and 1945. A study by Robert J. Lilly estimates that at least a total of 14,000 civilian women in Britain, France and Germany were raped by American GIs during World War II. It is estimated that there were at least 3,500 rapes by American servicemen in France between June 1944 and the end of the war and one historian has claimed that sexual violence against women in liberated France was common. In the 2007 publication Taken by Force, sociology and criminology professor J. Robert Lilly estimates US soldiers raped at least 11,040 women and children during the occupation of Germany. Many armed soldiers committed gang rapes at gunpoint against female civilians and children.

Red Army

During the war, German women were victims of brutal mass rapes committed against them by Soviet soldiers. Polish sources claim that mass rapes were committed in Polish cities that had been taken by the Red Army. It is reported that in Kraków, the Soviet occupation was accompanied by the mass rape of Polish women and girls, as well as the plunder of all private property by Soviet soldiers. Reportedly the scale of the attacks prompted communists installed by the Soviets to prepare a letter of protest to Joseph Stalin, while masses in churches were held in expectation of a Soviet withdrawal.

At the end of World War II, Red Army soldiers are estimated to have raped around 2,000,000 German women and girls. Norman Naimark a historian and fellow at the Conservative Hoover Institution writes in The Russians in Germany: A History of the Soviet Zone of Occupation, 1945–1949 that although the exact number of women and girls who were raped by members of the Red Army in the months preceding the capitulation, and in the years following it, will never be known, their numbers are likely to be in the hundreds of thousands, quite possibly as high as the two million victims estimated by Barbara Johr, in Befreier und Befreite. Many of these victims were raped repeatedly.

Atina Grossman in her article in "October" describes how until early 1945, the abortions in Germany were illegal except for medical and eugenic reasons and so doctors opened up and started performing abortions to rape victims for which only an affidavit was requested from a woman. It was also typical that women specified their reasons for abortions as being mostly socio-economic (inability to raise another child), rather than moral or ethical. Many women would claim they were raped but their accounts surprisingly described the rapist as looking Asian or Mongolian. German women uniformly described the rapist in racialist terms by claiming they were never blond but consistently "of Mongolian or Asiatic type".

A female Soviet war correspondent described what she had witnessed: "The Russian soldiers were raping every German female from eight to eighty. It was an army of rapists." The majority of the rapes were committed in the Soviet occupation zone and an estimated two million German women were raped by Soviet soldiers. According to historian William Hitchcock, in numerous cases women were victims of repeated rapes with some women being raped as many as 60 to 70 times. A minimum of 100,000 women are believed to have been raped in Berlin, based on surging abortion rates in the following months and on hospital reports written at the time, with an estimated 10,000 women dying in the aftermath. Female deaths resulting from rapes committed by Soviet soldiers stationed in Germany are estimated to total 240,000. Antony Beevor describes it as the "greatest phenomenon of mass rape in history", and he has concluded that at least 1.4 million women were raped in East Prussia, Pomerania and Silesia alone. According to Natalya Gesse, Soviet soldiers raped German females who were anywhere from eight to 80 years old. Soviet women were not spared either.

Antony Beevor estimates that up to half of all rape victims were victims of gang rapes. Naimark states that not only did each victim have to carry the trauma with her for the rest of her days, it also inflicted a massive collective trauma on the East German nation. Naimark concludes "The social psychology of women and men in the Soviet zone of occupation was marked by the crime of rape from the first days of the occupation, through the founding of the GDR in the fall of 1949, until, one could argue, the present." Some 90% of raped Berlin women in 1945 contracted sexually transmitted infections, and 3.7% of all children born in Germany from 1945 to 1946 had Soviet fathers. The history of the Soviet rape of German women was considered a taboo subject until after the dissolution of the USSR and East Germany.

At the end of the war, Yugoslav communist leaders protested to Stalin about the large number of rapes committed by Soviet troops who had liberated parts of Yugoslavia. In Milovan Djilas' Conversations with Stalin, Stalin is said to reply "Can’t he [Djilas] understand it if a soldier who has crossed thousands of kilometres through blood and fire and death has fun with a woman or takes some trifle?"

Korean War
During 11 months of 1952 in the 110,000-man logistics branch of Chinese Volunteer Army, there were 41 men charged with rapes.

Algerian War

Rape and other sexual violence against women was commonly used by French troops and opposing members of the Algerian National Liberation Front (FLN) during the Algerian War.

Vietnam War

Rape during the Vietnam War included sexual violence and rapes directed against Vietnamese civilians by United States and South Korean troops. According to Sabine Cherenfant, "some children likely were conceived through consensual relationships" while "many children were conceived through rape."

Indonesia

The Indonesian invasion of East Timor and West Papua caused the murders of approximately 300,000 to 400,000 West Papuans and many thousands of women raped.

Research by the Papuan Women's Working Group together with the Asia Justice Rights (AJAR) found 4 out 10 have either experienced shootings, torture, sexual violence, arbitrary detention, husbands/family members lost or killed, husbands/family members detained, or property theft/damaging.

1971 genocide in Bangladesh

During the Bangladesh Liberation War in 1971, numerous women were tortured and raped by the Pakistani army. Exact numbers are not known and are a subject of debate. Most of the women were captured from Dhaka University and private homes and kept as sex-slaves inside the Dhaka Cantonment. Australian Doctor Geoffrey Davis was brought to Bangladesh by the United Nation and International Planned Parenthood Federation to carry out late-term abortions on rape victims. He was of the opinion that the 200,000 to 400,000 rape victims was an underestimation. On the actions of Pakistan army he said "They'd keep the infantry back and put artillery ahead and they would shell the hospitals and schools. And that caused absolute chaos in the town. And then the infantry would go in and begin to segregate the women. Apart from little children, all those were sexually matured would be segregated... And then the women would be put in the compound under guard and made available to the troops… Some of the stories they told were appalling. Being raped again and again and again. A lot of them died in those [rape] camps".

Bangladeshi women have been raped during the Bangladesh Liberation War in 1971 by the Pakistan army during night raids on villages. Pakistani sources claim the number is much lower, though having not completely denied rape incidents. One work that has included direct experiences from the women raped is Ami Birangana Bolchi (The Voices of War Heroines) by Nilima Ibrahim. The word Birangona (war heroine) is a title given, by Sheikh Mujibur Rahman after the war, to the women raped and tortured during the war. This was a conscious effort to alleviate any social stigma the women might face in the society. How successful this effort was is doubtful, though.

In June 2005, the United States Department of State organized a conference titled "South Asia in Crisis: United States Policy, 1961–1972" where Sarmila Bose, published a paper suggesting that the casualties and rape allegations in the war have been greatly exaggerated for political purposes. This work has been criticized in Bangladesh and her research has been attacked by expatriate Bengalis.

During the war Bengali nationalists also indulged in the mass rape of ethnic Bihari Muslim women, since the Bihari Muslim community had remained loyal to the cause of a United Pakistan.

Anthony Mascarenhas, published a newspaper article in June 1971, in The Sunday Times, London on 13 June 1971 titled "Genocide". The article was the first that exposed the brutal crackdown by the Pakistan army. It also highlighted the rape of Bihari women and other atrocities committed against them by Bengalis. The Sunday Times editor Harold Evans wrote "He'd been shocked by the Bengali outrages in March, but he maintained that what the army was doing was altogether worse and on a grander scale".

1974 to 1992

In 1974, during the invasion of Cyprus by Turkey, Greek victims of rape were treated and received abortions at the British RAF bases at Akrotiri. Other documented instances of war rape include the First Liberian Civil War, and in East Timor during the occupation by Indonesia in 1975.

It has been reported that in Peru, throughout the 12-year internal conflict, women were frequent victims of sustained war rape perpetrated by government security forces and the Shining Path. It has also been reported that during the August 1990 invasion of Kuwait, an estimated 5,000 Kuwaiti women were raped by Iraqi soldiers, and at least one American POW was raped by Iraqi troops.

Soviet Invasion of Afghanistan 
The Soviet forces abducted Afghan women in helicopters while flying in the country in search of mujahideen. In November 1980 a number of such incidents had taken place in various parts of the country, including Laghman and Kama. Soviet soldiers as well as KhAD agents kidnapped young women from the city of Kabul and the areas of Darul Aman and Khair Khana, near the Soviet garrisons, to rape them. Women who returned home were considered 'dishonoured' by their families.

Tigray War

Myanmar civil war 

The Myanmar Armed Forces has used multiple forms of sexual violence against civilians for decades, including rape, gang rape, coerced sex, forced marriage, and sexual slavery, and has been singled out by the Secretary-General of the United Nations since 2012. Since the 2021 Myanmar coup d'état, the military has escalated its systemic use of sexual violence, especially against women and political prisoners. Survivors face societal and legal challenges in reporting their crimes. During the Tar Taing massacre in March 2023, army troops raped and sexually assaulted at least 3 women before executing them.

2022 Russian invasion of Ukraine 

During the 2022 Russian invasion of Ukraine, Ukrainian officials, rights groups, and international media reported growing evidence of sexual violence used by Russian military against Ukrainian women. Survivors of Russian occupation of the areas around Kyiv, such as Bucha, reported gang-rapes, assaults taking place at gunpoint, and rapes committed in front of children. Lyudmyla Denisova, Ukraine's Human Rights Commissioner, stated that sexual violence against civilians was weaponized by Russian soldiers as part of what she referred to as "genocide of Ukrainian people". According to Denisova, as of 6 April 2022, a special telephone helpline had received at least 25 reports of rape of women and girls from Bucha, aged between 14 and 24. The Security Service of Ukraine posted a recording allegedly of a Russian woman encouraging her deployed partner to rape Ukrainian women as long as he uses protection.

In October 2022, a UN official stated that Russia was using rape as part of its "military strategy", and that the actual number of victims was likely far higher than the official statistics.

Causes
Wars and civil conflicts can create a "culture of violence" or a "culture of impunity" towards human rights abuses of civilians.  During periods of armed conflict, there are structures, actors, and processes at a number of levels that affect the likelihood of violence against civilians.
Sexual violence is one of many types of violence directed against civilians in wartime situations.

Among some armies, looting of civilian areas is considered a way for soldiers to supplement their often meager income, which can be unstable if soldiers are not paid on time. Some militias that cannot afford to adequately pay their troops promote pillaging as a compensation for victory, and rape of civilians can be seen as a reward for winning battles.

According to UNICEF, "systematic rape is often used as a weapon of war in ethnic cleansing," having been used in various armed conflicts throughout the twentieth century alone, including Bosnia and Herzegovina, Cambodia, Uganda, and Vietnam. In 2008, the United Nations Security Council argued that "women and girls are particularly targeted by the use of sexual violence, including as a tactic of war to humiliate, dominate, instil fear in, disperse and/or forcibly relocate civilian members of a community or ethnic group."

Inger Skjelsbæ carried out a review of 140 publications explaining wartime sexual violence. She argues that explanations must take account of the increased general risk of rape, that certain groups of women are at more risk of rape, and that men are raped. She distinguishes three classes of explanations of rape: essentialist, that view rape during war as an intrinsic part of male behavior; structuralist, that view rape as having a political component; and social constructionist, that view rape as having a particular meaning depending on context. In the structuralist framework, rape may be seen as a form of torture designed to destroy a woman's identity as a woman within a particular culture, or to destroy an ethnic community itself. She cites examples of women being raped in front of other civilians, and different groups of women being more likely to experience sexual violence. In the social constructionist framework, she cites work that argues that the act of sexual intercourse can be used to feminize one participant and masculinize another, so the rape of men can seem to damage the identity of those who are raped by feminizing them.

Dara Kay Cohen argues that some military groups use gang rape to bond soldiers and create a sense of cohesion within units, particularly when troops are recruited by force. Amnesty International argues that in modern conflicts rape is used deliberately as a military strategy. Amnesty International describes war rape as a "weapon of war" or a "means of combat" used for the purpose of conquering territory by expelling the population therefrom, decimating remaining civilians by destroying their links of affiliations, by the spread of AIDS, and by eliminating cultural and religious traditions. Gayatri Chakravorty Spivak characterizes "group rape perpetrated by the conquerors" as "a metonymic celebration of territorial acquisition".

Evidence provided by Cohen also suggests that some militaries that use child soldiers use rape as a maturation ritual to increase the tolerance of troops for violence, especially in patriarchal societies that equate masculinity with dominance and control. Some refugees and internally displaced people experience human trafficking for sexual or labour exploitation due to the breakdown of economies and policing in conflict regions.[10] In some conflicts, rape is used as a means of extracting information to force women and girls to give up the location of arms caches. In discussing gang rape as a means of bonding among soldiers, Cohen discusses the viewpoint of "combatant socialization", in which military groups use gang rape as a socialization tactic during armed conflict. By using gang rape during armed conflict, militia group members:
 Prompt feelings of power and achievement
 Establish status and a reputation for aggressiveness
 Create an enhanced feeling of masculinity through bonding and bragging
 Demonstrate dedication to the group and a willingness to take risks
While war rape may not be an apparent tool or weapon of war, it does serve as a primary tool to create a cohesive military group.

Legitimisation
Some political and military leaders publicly suggested during the twenty-first century that wartime sexual violence is legitimate in the sense that it is humorous, insignificant in comparison to military deaths, or expected.

In January 2019, Ethiopian prime minister Abiy Ahmed stated, "So, if you're wondering what the proportion of Oromo in Tigray is, leave it for DNA to find out. [Hilarity in the audience] It's probably wrong to say this, but: those who went to Adwa, to fight, didn't just go and come back. Each of them had about 10 kids. [Loud laughter of the audience and applause]." On 21 March 2021, during the Tigray War that started in early November 2020, Abiy suggested that sexual violence in the war was insignificant compared to military deaths, stating, "The women in Tigray? These women have only been penetrated by men, whereas our soldiers were penetrated by a knife." An unnamed Ethiopian general was quoted by physical geographer Jan Nyssen as stating during early 2021 that, in the context of the Tigray War, rape during wartime was "expected", but should not happen in the presence of federal police or administrative officials. Peace researcher Alex de Waal interpreted the comments by the prime minister as Abiy "jok[ing] about" gang rape.

Gender

Rape of women
Susan Brownmiller was the first historian to attempt an overview of rape in war with documentation and theory. Brownmiller's thesis is that "War provides men with the perfect psychological backdrop to give vent to their contempt for women. The maleness of the military—the brute power of weaponry exclusive to their hands, the spiritual bonding of men at arms, the manly discipline of orders given and orders obeyed, the simple logic of the hierarchical command—confirms for men what they long suspect—that women are peripheral to the world that counts." She writes that rape accompanies territorial advance by the winning side in land conflicts as one of the spoils of war, and that "Men who rape are ordinary Joes, made unordinary by entry into the most exclusive male-only club in the world."

An estimated 45 million plus civilians died during World War II. Male and female civilians may be subject to torture, but many studies show that war rape is more frequently perpetrated on women than men. This may be due to the reluctance of men to come forward with accusations of being raped, and also an institutional bias amongst NGOs, who frequently focus resources on female victims. However rape against women is also underreported. Perpetrators of sexual violence against women and children "commonly include not only enemy civilians and troops but also allied and national civilians and even comrades in arms."

The victims of war rape are usually "civilians", a category first recognized in the 19th century. Although war rape of women is documented throughout history, laws protecting civilians in armed conflict have tended not to recognize sexual assault on women. Even when laws of war have recognized and forbidden sexual assault, few prosecutions have been brought. According to Kelly Dawn Askin, the laws of war perpetuated the attitude that sexual assaults against women are less significant crimes, not worthy of prosecution. Until the early twenty-first century, war rape had been a hidden element of war. Human Rights Watch linked the hidden aspect to the largely gender-specific character of war rape – abuse committed by men against women. This gender-specific character has contributed to war rape being "narrowly portrayed as sexual or personal in nature, a portrayal that depoliticizes sexual abuse in conflict and results in its being ignored as a war crime."

"To the victor go the spoils" has been a war cry for centuries, and women classed as part of the spoils of war. Furthermore, war rape has been downplayed as an unfortunate but inevitable side effect of sending men to war. Also, war rape has in the past been regarded as a tangible reward to soldiers (who were paid irregularly), and as a soldier's proof of masculinity and success. In reference to war rape in ancient times, Harold Washington argues that warfare itself is imaged as rape, and that the cities attacked are its victims. He argues that war rape occurs in the context of stereotypes about women and men, which are part of the basic belief that violent power belongs to men, and that women are its victims.

Rape of men
The rape of men by other men is also common in war. A 2009 study by Lara Stemple found that it had been documented in conflicts worldwide; for example, 76% of male political prisoners in 1980s El Salvador and 80% of concentration camp inmates in Sarajevo reported being raped or sexually tortured. Stemple concludes that the "lack of attention to sexual abuse of men during conflict is particularly troubling given the widespread reach of the problem". Mervyn Christian of Johns Hopkins School of Nursing has found that male rape is commonly underreported.

According to a survey published in the Journal of the American Medical Association in 2010, 30% of women and 22% of men from the eastern part of the Democratic Republic of the Congo reported that they had been subject to conflict-related sexual violence. Despite the popular perception that rape during conflict is primarily targeted against women, these figures show that sexual violence committed against men is not a marginal occurrence. The lack of awareness for the magnitude of the rape of men during conflict relates to chronic underreporting. Although the physical and psychological repercussions from rape are similar for women and men, male victims tend to demonstrate an even greater reluctance to report their suffering to their families or the authorities.

According to The Guardian, "Both perpetrator and victim enter a conspiracy of silence and why male survivors often find, once their story is discovered, that they lose the support and comfort of those around them. In the patriarchal societies found in many developing countries, gender roles are strictly defined. … Often, … wives who discover their husbands have been raped decide to leave them. They ask me: 'So now how am I going to live with him? As what? Is this still a husband? Is it a wife?' They ask, 'If he can be raped, who is protecting me?'".

Sexual violence against men weaponizes ideas of gender and sexuality against victims, reinforcing gendered hierarchies and causing tremendous physical and mental pain to victims. Men are expected to exert violence, while women are victimized by it. In conflict situations, rape against men dissolves this relationship and puts men in the 'receiving' role of the victim. Similarly, the 'penetrating' role of men as opposed to the 'receiving' role of women in conventional sexual intercourse illustrates this constructed power relationship. Hence, male rape victims experience the worst possible 'humiliation' with regards to the ingrained social roles they are traditionally expected to fulfill. Moreover, their stigmatization takes on particularly severe dimensions within conservative social environments in which homosexual intercourse – regardless of consent – is punished harshly. For example, Ugandan male rape victims explain their choice to not speak out with the fear of being branded homosexuals. As homosexuality is widely condemned in Uganda, male victims of sexual violence often struggle to get proper support because they are accused of being gay. In certain cases, gender roles concerning violence and sexual conduct are so deeply ingrained that the mere existence of male rape is denied. In Nigeria 81 per cent of people are supposedly against human rights for homosexuals. A 2021 study showed that as a result, both victims and perpetrators justify the act as a form of spiritual security which will bring the perpetrators 'physical safety, material wealth or socio-political ascendancy.'

Effects

Physical effects
A 2013 study lists the physical injury to the victims of war rape as traumatic injuries, sexually transmitted diseases, maternal mortality, unwanted pregnancies, unsafe abortions, and persistent gynecological problems are of major concern. Because war rapes take place in zones of conflict, access to emergency contraception, antibiotics, and abortion are limited. Infection with the human immunodeficiency virus (HIV) is not uncommon. In certain instances, women were taunted by soldiers with the threat of infection.

War rape may include physical rape of the male organ. Gang rape and rape with human objects or physical objects, such as fists, sticks, rods, and gun barrels are also methods used in war rape. Women victims may suffer from incontinence and vaginal fistula as a result of these particularly violent instances of rape. Vaginal fistula is a medical condition of vaginal abnormality where there is hole in the vagina in close proximity to the colon (anus or rectum) or bladder. In some cases, it is a birth defect, in others it is a result of female genital cutting (FGM) and rape. In extreme instances of violent rape in war, the walls of the vagina are torn or punctured, resulting in severe pain and debilitating incontinence (urinary complications) and bowel containment. Violent rape is also a cause of obstetric fistula which is a hole in the female organ and birth canal.

Physical effects may also include bone breakage such as backbreaking and cranial cracks, causing future disability, visual and hearing impairment, and mental incapacitation.

Psychological effects
Victims and survivors of war rape are at very high risk of psychosocial problems.

The short-term psychological injuries to the victims include feelings of fear, helplessness, sadness, disorientation, isolation, vulnerability, and desperation. If left untreated, the psychological effects of sexual assault and rape can be devastating, sometimes even deadly. Causes of death as the result of sexual violence include suicide and murder. Murder of sexual assault and rape victims may be perpetrated by the rapist or as part of an honor killing by family members of the victim.

Long-term psychological injuries may include depression, anxiety disorders (including post-traumatic stress syndrome (PTSS)), multiple somatic symptoms, flashbacks, on-going trauma, chronic insomnia, self-hatred, nightmares, paranoia, difficulty re-establishing intimate relationships, shame, disgust, anger, and persistent fears. They could have trouble sleeping, experience changes in their appetite, or develop full-blown emotional problems, including posttraumatic stress disorder, depression, substance abuse, or dependence. Individuals who have experienced sexual assault are at risk for other day-to-day problems, including arguing with family members and having problems at work. Lack of medical psychological support resources also puts victims of war rape at further disadvantage. Refugee women are also at a disadvantage of receiving adequate assistance to deal with the psychological consequences of war rape – not only do they lack legal representation, they also may lack protection from the perpetrators of the violent act. Furthermore, there is an increase in dislike of refugees and asylum seekers which is another obstacle in the psychological healing process of victims seeking assistance outside of their countries that may still be under civil strife. Psychological support and counseling sessions given by individuals not part of the ethnic, linguistic, or community may incite difficulties in communication between patient and caregiver. As a result, adequate emotional and psychological support to the victims is not fully developed, affecting the long-term healing potential for the patient.

Psychosocial and societal effects
In addition to the physical and psychological damages resulting from rape, sexual violence in the context of war often disrupt the linkages between the rape victims and their communities. Thus, the phenomenon of war rape can structurally affect entire societies, which is closely linked to the logic underlying the strategic use of rape as an instrument in armed conflicts. Raping 'enemy' women also constitutes an act of abuse and humiliation against the men of the community the victims were representative of.

Research in 2019 suggests that wartime sexual violence may increase instances of intimate partner abuse in the affected society. A study on the aftermath of civil war in Peru estimated that in departments which had experienced conflict-related sexual violence, women in the department were at increased risk of intimate partner violence after the war.

Besides the psychosocial effects on women as the most frequent victims of wartime rape, children born of rape are faced with distinct social stigmas. The existence of taboos around the issue of war rape can also be an obstacle to post-conflict reconciliation.

Stigmatization and isolation
Psychosocial consequences of war rape describe how the linkages between victims and the society are altered as a result of sexual abuses during war. Both during and even more in the aftermath of conflict, when abuses become known, victims of war rape risk finding themselves in situations of social isolation, often abandoned by their husbands and rejected by their communities The ordeal is thus not over with the survival of the act of abuse but has a long-term effect that can only to a limited extent be dealt with by the victims themselves. The process of re-victimization captures how victims of sexual violence continue to "receive additional hurt after the direct cause of victimization has disappeared" with stigmatization and exclusion being among the main sources of re-victimization.

This is particularly relevant in patriarchal societies, where female sexuality is linked to male honour, virginity is a core value, and where a culture considers ethnicity transmitted through male genes. Given the ethnic dimension of sexuality, rape can become a means of ethnic cleansing or genocide, as has been claimed in relation to systematic instances of rape in Rwanda and Bosnia. In this context, "rape as a weapon of war is not an individual issue, but a societal one." In a number of countries, the targeted infection of women with HIV, which creates further suffering for victims experiencing social exclusion and discrimination for having HIV/AIDS.

Impact on children who are born as a result of rape
War rape can have an equally strong and a long-lasting effect on children who are born as a result of it. On the one hand, these children may not be immediately identified and as a result, they might not find out about their origins until they reach a later point in their lives. In turn, if the children themselves but even more importantly, if the community knows about the 'war babies', they risk being regarded as the 'other' by the communities into which they were born. Recurring patterns in countries which include Bosnia and Herzegovina, Uganda, Sierra Leone and Rwanda show how children who were born as a result of war rape and the mothers who do not want them both have to face struggles with regard to issues which are related to their identities – both in an administrative and a personal sense – and their rights are sometimes restricted, such as their right to obtain an education and their right to be protected from discrimination and physical harm. Unwanted children who were born as a result of rape are potentially more vulnerable in both a psychological and a physical way and cases of child abandonment have been reported in various contemporary conflict and post-conflict societies.

Impact on post-conflict reconciliation
The societal consequences of war rape can equally have a negative impact on post-conflict reconciliation and the judicial follow-up on wartime crimes, including rape. Given the stigmatisation of victims and their isolation or fear thereof, they might prefer to remain silent with regard to the violations they have suffered. Indeed, underreporting of cases of rape during armed conflict is a practical challenge post-conflict communities have to face that is pointed to by a number of actors, including the United Nations Secretary-General, the United Nations High Commissioner for Human Rights as well as international NGOs.

As Human Rights Watch reported with regard to war rape during the Rwandan genocide, victims "expressed dismay at the fact that they were being urged to forget what happened to them in the name of peace and reconciliation". The fear of consequences and threat of exclusion felt by the victims makes it difficult to establish clear figures of war rape incidents and to hold perpetrators accountable for the crimes they have committed, as has been claimed with regards to war rape in Darfur: "Underreporting of cases may be attributed to the stigma associated with rape, shame and fear of reprisal, denial that rape occurs, intimidation by many Government officials and the inability to access some conflict-affected areas". This points to another difficulty victims of war rape have to deal with at the societal level. The perpetrators of rape are often officials or otherwise affiliated with the state's institutions, which might make reporting of assaults appear useless.

Psychiatric care
Disrupted healthcare sectors is a term the World Health Organization describes for medical facilities that are destroyed or partially destroyed in war torn areas. Health care facilities are essential for the establishment of support systems for rape victims. Psychological support units are also hampered by the lack of material resources available to the medical community on-ground. Medical practitioners and health-care workers face daunting challenges in conflict and post-conflict area. As the WHO explains, "healthcare delivery fragments and deteriorates, memory and knowledge are eroded, and power disperses". War-torn societies in immediate post-conflict zones have broken medical infrastructure such as: destroyed or partially destroyed hospitals (or clinics); non-functioning hospitals; poor, scarce or inadequate medical supplies, lack of running water, and scarce or lack of electricity. Dismantling weapons from armed rebels and other groups are prioritized in immediate post-conflict situations which in effect de-prioritizes the immediate physical and psychiatric care that war rape victims are in urgent need of. "If we do not have the capacity to prevent war, we have a collective responsibility to better understand and treat its psychiatric, medical, and social consequences." Access to psychological health services further causes inequity for survivors of war rape who are at the margins of society living in chronic poverty or located in rural regions. Healthcare and psychiatric care is a key component to the healing processes of war rape.

Impact

Former Yugoslavia

Evidence of the magnitude of rape in Bosnia and Herzegovina prompted the International Criminal Tribunal for the former Yugoslavia (ICTY) to deal openly with these abuses. The issue of rape during armed conflict was brought to the attention of the United Nations after the breakup of Yugoslavia in the early 1990s, in conjunction with the Bosnian war. Reports of sexual violence during the Bosnian War (1992–1995) and Kosovo War (1998–1999), part of the Yugoslav wars, a series of conflicts from 1991 to 1999, have been described as "especially alarming". During the Kosovo War thousands of Kosovo Albanian women and girls became victims of sexual violence by Serbian paramilitaries, soldiers or policemen. The majority of rapes were gang rapes. Following the entry of NATO in the Kosovo War, rapes of Serbian, Albanian, and Roma women were committed by ethnic Albanians. Rapes by members of the Kosovo Liberation Army have also been documented.

It has been estimated that during the Bosnian War between 20,000 and 50,000 women were raped. The majority of the rape victims were Muslim women raped by Serbian soldiers. Although men also became victim of sexual violence, war rape was disproportionately directed against women who were (gang) raped in the streets, in their homes and/or in front of family members. Sexual violence occurred in multiple ways, including rape with objects, such as broken glass bottles, guns and truncheons. War rape occurred as a matter of official orders as part of ethnic cleansing, to displace the targeted ethnic group out of the region.

During the Bosnian War, the existence of deliberately created "rape camps" was reported. The reported aim of these camps was to impregnate the Muslim and Croatian women held captive. It has been reported that often women were kept in confinement until the late stage of their pregnancy. This occurred in the context of a patrilineal society, in which children inherit their father's ethnicity, hence the "rape camps" aimed at the birth of a new generation of Serb children. According to the Women's Group Tresnjevka more than 35,000 women and children were held in such Serb-run "rape camps".

During the Kosovo War thousands of Kosovar Albanian women and girls became victims of sexual violence. War rape was used as a weapon of war and an instrument of systematic ethnic cleansing; rape was used to terrorize the civilian population, extort money from families, and force people to flee their homes. According to a 2000 Human Rights Watch report war rape in the Kosovo War can generally be subdivided into three categories: rapes in women's homes, rapes during fighting, and rapes in detention. The majority of the perpetrators were Serbian paramilitaries, but they also included Serbian special police or Yugoslav army soldiers. Most rapes were gang rapes involving at least two perpetrators. Rapes occurred frequently in the presence, and with the acquiescence, of military officers. Soldiers, police, and paramilitaries often raped their victims in the full view of numerous witnesses.

Mass rape in the Bosnian War

During the Bosnian War, Bosnian Serb forces conducted a sexual abuse strategy against thousands of Bosnian Muslim girls and women which became known as a "mass rape phenomenon". No exact figures on how many women and children were systematically raped by the Serb forces in various camps were established, but estimates range from 20,000 to 50,000. Mass rape mostly occurred in eastern Bosnia (especially during the Foča and Višegrad massacres), and in Grbavica during the Siege of Sarajevo. Numerous Bosnian Serb officers, soldiers and other participants were indicted or convicted of rape as a war crime by the ICTY and the Court of Bosnia and Herzegovina. The events inspired the Golden Bear winner at the 56th Berlin International Film Festival in 2006, called Grbavica.

Rwandan genocide

During the Rwandan genocide, from April until July 1994, hundreds of thousands of women and girls were raped or became the victims of other forms of sexual violence. Although no explicit written orders to commit rape and other acts of sexual violence have been found, evidence suggests that military leaders encouraged or ordered their men to rape the Tutsis, and they also condoned the acts which were already taking place, without making efforts to stop them. Compared to other conflicts, the sexual violence in Rwanda stands out in terms of the organised nature of the propaganda that contributed significantly to fuelling sexual violence against Tutsi women, the very public nature of the rapes and the level of brutality towards the women. Anne-Marie de Brouwer concludes that considering the massive scale and public nature of war rape during the Rwandan genocide, "it is difficult to imagine anybody in Rwanda who was not aware of the sexual violence taking place." In 1998, the International Criminal Tribunal for Rwanda made the landmark decision that the war rape during the Rwanda genocide was an element of the crime of genocide. The Trial Chamber held that "sexual assault formed an integral part of the process of destroying the Tutsi ethnic group and that the rape was systematic and had been perpetrated against Tutsi women only, manifesting the specific intent required for those acts to constitute genocide."

In his 1996 report, the United Nations Special Rapporteur on Rwanda, Rene Degni-Segui stated that "rape was the rule and its absence was the exception." The report also stated that "rape was systematic and was used as a "weapon" by the perpetrators of the massacres. This can be estimated from the number and nature of the victims as well as from the forms of rape." A 2000 report prepared by the Organisation of African Unity's International Panel of Eminent Personalities concluded that "we can be certain that almost all females who survived the genocide were direct victims of rape or other sexual violence, or were profoundly affected by it".

The Special Rapporteur on Rwanda estimated in his 1996 report that between 2,000 and 5,000 pregnancies resulted from war rape, and that between 250,000 and 500,000 Rwandese women and girls had been raped. Rwanda is a patriarchal society and children therefore take the ethnicity of the father, underlining the fact that war rape occurred in the context of genocide.

Within the context of the Rwandan genocide, victims of sexual violence were predominantly attacked on the basis of their gender and ethnicity. The victims were mostly Tutsi women and girls, of all ages, while men were only seldom the victims of war rape. Women were demonized in the anti-Tutsi propaganda prior to the 1994 genocide. The December 1990 issue of the newspaper Kangura published the "Ten Commandments", four of which portrayed Tutsi women as tools of the Tutsi community, as sexual weapons that would be used by the Tutsi to weaken and ultimately to destroy the Hutu men. Gender based propaganda also included cartoons printed in newspapers that portrayed Tutsi women as sex objects. Examples of gender based hate propaganda used to incite war rape included statements by perpetrators such as "You Tutsi women think that you are too good for us" and "Let us see what a Tutsi woman tastes like". Victims of war rape during the Rwandan genocide also included Hutu women considered moderates, such as Hutu women married to Tutsi men and Hutu women politically affiliated with the Tutsi. War rape also occurred regardless of ethnicity or political affiliation, with young or beautiful women being targeted based on their gender only. Sexual violence against men occurred significantly less frequently, but it frequently included the mutilation of their genitals, which were often displayed in public. The perpetrators of war rape during the Rwandan genocide were mainly members of the Hutu militia, the "Interahamwe". Rapes were also committed by military personnel within the Rwandan Armed Forces (FAR), including the Presidential Guard, and civilians.

Sexual violence against women and girls during the Rwandan genocide included: rape, gang rape, sexual slavery (either collectively or individually through "forced marriages"), rape with objects such as sticks and weapons often leading to the victim's death, sexual mutilation of, in particular, breasts, vaginas or buttocks, often during or following rape. Pregnant women were not spared from sexual violence and on many occasions victims were killed following rape. Many women were raped by men who knew they were HIV positive and it has been suggested that there were deliberate attempts to transmit the virus to Tutsi women and their families. War rape occurred all over the country and it was frequently perpetrated in plain view of others, at sites such as schools, churches, roadblocks, government buildings or in the bush. Some women were kept as personal slaves for years after the genocide, and they were eventually forced to move to neighbouring countries after the genocide along with their captors.

The long-term effects of war rape in Rwanda on its victims include social isolation (the social stigma attached to rape meant that some husbands left their wives who had become victims of war rape, or that the victims became unmarriageable), unwanted pregnancies and babies (some women resorted to self-induced abortions), sexually transmitted diseases, including syphilis, gonorrhoea and HIV/AIDS (access to anti-retroviral drugs remains limited).

The International Criminal Tribunal for Rwanda, established in 1994 after the Rwandan Genocide, has only brought three perpetrators before the Tribunal, with the first conviction in 1998.

Sri Lankan Civil War

During the Sri Lankan Civil War, multiple Human Rights Organizations reported cases of rape, violence and disappearance of women in the 1990s, claiming to be committed by security forces. Government officials, including the president, have denied the claims and agreed to co-operate with the investigations and prosecute whomever they find guilty. The UN Special Rapporteur has reported that individual investigations and proceedings relating to these cases have commenced at the local magistrates courts.

Some of the notable cases of murdered raped victims and the massacres associated with the rape incidents are Krishanti Kumaraswamy, Arumaithurai Tharmaletchumi, Ida Carmelitta, Ilayathambi Tharsini, Murugesapillai Koneswary, Premini Thanuskodi, Sarathambal, Kumarapuram massacre and Vankalai massacre.

Philippines: Mindanao and Sulu 

On 24 September 1974, in the Malisbong massacre the Armed Forces of the Philippines slaughtered 1,766 Moro Muslim civilians who were praying at a Mosque in addition to mass raping Moro girls who had been taken aboard a boat.

Bangladesh: Chittagong Hill Tracts 

In the Chittagong Hill Tracts Bengali settlers and soldiers have raped native Jumma (Chakma) women "with impunity" with the Bangladeshi security forces doing little to protect the Jummas and instead assisting the rapists and settlers.

Kashmir conflict

Numerous scholars and human rights agencies assert that since the onset of the insurgency in Jammu and Kashmir in 1988, rape has been leveraged as a 'weapon of war' by Indian security forces comprising the Indian Army, Central Reserve Police Force (CRPF) and Border Security personnel.

21st century
According to Amnesty International, documented cases of war rape in the early twenty-first century include incidents in Afghanistan, Chechnya, Colombia, Iraq, Sudan, and Nepal.

Commenting on the rape of women and children in African conflict zones, UNICEF said in 2008 that rape was no longer just perpetrated by combatants but also by civilians. According to UNICEF rape is common in countries affected by wars and natural disasters, drawing a link between the occurrence of sexual violence and significant uprooting of a society and the crumbling of social norms. UNICEF states that in Kenya reported cases of sexual violence doubled within days of post-election conflict erupting. According to UNICEF rape was prevalent in conflict zones in Sudan, Chad, and the Democratic Republic of Congo.

Democratic Republic of the Congo

In Eastern Congo, the prevalence and intensity of rape and other sexual violence is described as the worst in the world. A 2010 study found that 22% of men and 30% of women in Eastern Congo reported conflict-related sexual violence.

Since fighting broke out in 1998 tens of thousands of people have been raped in the Democratic Republic of Congo. It is estimated that there are as many as 200,000 surviving rape victims living in the Democratic Republic of the Congo today. War rape in the Democratic Republic of Congo has frequently been described as a "weapon of war" by commentators. Louise Nzigire, a local social worker, states that "this violence was designed to exterminate the population." Nzigire observes that rape has been a "cheap, simple weapon for all parties in the war, more easily obtainable than bullets or bombs." The rape of men is also common. Men who admit they were raped risk ostracism by their community, and criminal prosecution, because they may be seen as homosexual, which is a crime in 38 African countries.

Despite the peace process launched in 2003, sexual assault by soldiers from armed groups and the national army continues in the eastern provinces of the country. Evidence of war rape emerged when United Nations troops move into areas previously ravaged by war after the peace process started. Gang rape and rape with objects has been reported. The victims of war rape may suffer from incontinence and vaginal fistula as a result of particularly violent rape. Witness accounts include an instance of a woman who had the barrel of a gun inserted into her vagina, after which the soldier opened fire. Incontinence and vaginal fistula leads to the isolation of war rape victims from her community and access to reconstructive surgery is limited in the Democratic Republic of the Congo.

More than 500 rapes were reported in Eastern Congo in August 2010, leading to an apology from Atul Khare that the UN peacekeepers had failed to protect the population from brutalisation. In 2020 the UN reported that in the Democratic Republic of Congo, a young man from Tanganyika Province was stripped naked, raped, and coerced by the Twa militia to rape his own mother. Similar violence against men and boys while in detention were also reported.

Darfur region in Sudan

A 19 October 2004 UN News Centre article titled "UNICEF adviser says rape in Darfur, Sudan continues with impunity" reported:

Armed militias in Sudan's strife-torn Darfur region are continuing to rape women and girls with impunity, an expert from the United Nations children's agency said today on her return from a mission to the region. Pamela Shifman, the UN Children's Fund (UNICEF) adviser on violence and sexual exploitation, said she heard dozens of harrowing accounts of sexual assaults – including numerous reports of gang-rapes – when she visited internally displaced persons (IDPs) at one camp and another settlement in North Darfur last week. "Rape is used as a weapon to terrorize individual women and girls, and also to terrorize their families and to terrorize entire communities," she said in an interview with the UN News Service. "No woman or girl is safe."

In the same article Pamela Shifman was reported to have said that:

Every woman or girl she spoke to had either endured sexual assault herself, or knew of someone who had been attacked, particularly when they left the relative safety of their IDP camp or settlement to find firewood.

Iraq War

Male prisoners of war may be subject to rape and sexual violence. Sexual violence against male prisoners of the Iraq War gained wide publicity after graphic photos documented such abuses on male Iraqi prisoners by US guards at Abu Ghraib prison, where prisoners were forced to humiliate themselves. American soldiers gang raped a 14-year-old Iraqi girl in the Mahmudiyah rape and killings. US soldiers also sodomized children with women present when the women and children were arrested together and it was recorded on video tape according to Seymour Hersh. An Iraqi girl, 14 years old, was raped multiple times by US guards according to The Guardian and an Iraqi woman called Noor sent a letter from the prison detailing her rape by US military policeman which was verified by US Major General Antonio Taguba in his report. US soldiers forced Iraqi male detainees at Abu Ghraib to engage in homosexual activities with each other and forced their anuses to make contact with each other's penises by piling them up on each other while their legs and hands were shackled and handcuffed. Iraqi female lawyer Amal Kadham Swadi interviewed an Iraqi woman raped by multiple American soldiers, telling her to keep it a secret, saying "We have daughters and husbands. For God's sake don't tell anyone about this." She had stitches on her arm from injuries when she tried to resist the rape and these were seen by Swadi. She was held in Baghdad in November 2003 at the former police compound al-Kharkh which was used as a US military base.

2011 – present Iraqi insurgency

The Islamic State of Iraq and the Levant (ISIL) has employed sexual violence against women and men in a manner that has been described as "terrorism". ISIL has utilized sexual violence in order to undermine a sense of security within communities, as well as to raise funds through the sale of captives into sexual slavery. According to The Wall Street Journal, ISIL appeals to apocalyptic beliefs and claims "justification by a Hadith that they interpret as portraying the revival of slavery as a precursor to the end of the world". In late 2014, ISIL released a pamphlet on the treatment of female slaves. The New York Times said in August 2015 that "[t]he systematic rape of women and girls from the Yazidi religious minority has become deeply enmeshed in the organization and the radical theology of the Islamic State in the year since the group announced it was reviving slavery as an institution."

2011 Libyan civil war

The chief prosecutor of the International Criminal Court (ICC), Luis Moreno Ocampo, claimed that there is evidence that Gaddafi's troops used rape as a weapon during the Libyan civil war. He also said, "Apparently, he [Gaddafi] decided to punish, using rape," while witnesses confirmed that the Libyan government also purchased a large number of Viagra-like drugs. The Libyan government, on the other hand, does not recognize the ICC's jurisdiction.

Afghan Taliban 
In 2015, Amnesty International reported that the Afghan Taliban had engaged in mass murders and gang rapes of Afghan civilians in Kunduz. Taliban fighters killed and raped the female relatives of police commanders and soldiers. The Taliban also raped and killed midwives who they accused of providing reproductive health services to women in the city. One female human rights activist described the situation:When the Taliban asserted their control over Kunduz, they claimed to be bringing law and order and Shari'a to the city. But everything they've done has violated both. I don't know who can rescue us from this situation.

Rape in contemporary peace operations by UN peacekeepers

In contemporary conflict zones, international organizations, particularly the United Nations peacekeepers, have been involved in maintaining peace and stability in the area as well as distribute humanitarian aid to the local population. At present there are 16 Peace Operations directed by the UN Department of Peacekeeping Operations. The peacekeepers are mainly composed of military personnel (but to a less number also the police) sent by governments of various member-states. However, over the course of their involvement in the field, peacekeepers have also been accused and at times found guilty of committing rape and other forms of sexual violence to the local population, in particular to women and children. Among all international staff in the conflict zone, United Nations peacekeepers (handled by the Department of Peacekeeping Operations) have been most frequently identified as the perpetrators of rape.

Motivations for rape and sexual abuse by peacekeepers

Like traditional military ventures, peacekeepers are deployed in highly unstable areas similar to war zones, where there is absence of the rule of law, disintegration of society and great psychological and economic hardships. Having an image of wealth and authority, peacekeepers can easily exercise power over the local population, which is often abused.

Moreover, as members of their respective country's militaries, peacekeepers also carry with them in the peace operations the "hyper-masculine culture" that encourages sexual exploitation and abuse. The motivations for rape differ from the traditional perpetrators (government and rebel forces) in that rape is not part of a war strategy that contributes to fulfilling the organization's mission, but rather more as means to relieve the perpetrators' sexual urges most often related to the military culture. Apart from putting the victim under the threat of physical violence, perpetrators induce sexual acts from the victim through payment, and granting or denying humanitarian aid.

Cases of rape and sexual abuse in peace operations

UN peacekeepers' involvement in rape was found as early as 1993 during the Bosnian genocide, where peacekeepers were found to regularly visit a Serb-run brothel in Sarajevo that housed Bosniak and Croat women who were forced to become prostitutes. According to the Outlook, sexual misconduct by Indian soldiers and officers on UN duty in Congo raised disturbing questions. In the early twenty-first century, several UN soldiers in Haiti have been accused and convicted of raping boys as young as 14 years. In one instance, Uruguayan UN soldiers were accused in 2011 of raping a Haitian boy, sparking protests that called for the withdrawal of UN peacekeeping forces. In Congo in 2004, peacekeepers from Uruguay, Morocco, Tunisia, South Africa and Nepal have faced 68 cases of rape, prostitution and pedophilia. The investigation resulted in the jailing of six Nepalese troops. In Sudan, the Egyptian contingent was accused of raping six women when the civilians took shelter at the peacekeepers' headquarters in order to flee from the fighting. Allegations of rape of young women and children have also been launched against UN peacekeepers in South Sudan. In Mali, four UN peacekeepers from Chad were involved in the rape of a woman. Members of the Moroccan contingent faced rape charges during the course of their duties at the UN mission in Ivory Coast.

Punitive measures

The most common challenge in reprimanding perpetrators is the significant underreporting of the issue mainly due to three reasons. First, the victims do not report or file complaints due to fears of revenge from the offender(s), denial of aid and the social stigma against rape victims in the victims' own community. Second, UN higher officials previously dismissed such allegations as "boys will be boys". Third, fellow peacekeepers are accustomed to the "wall of silence" in the spirit of brotherhood characteristic of military culture but also to protect the reputation of their sending government. As a consequence, whistleblowers are often stigmatised.

However, if there would indeed be reports, the UN instituted the Conduct and Discipline Teams (CDTs) to conduct an investigation referring the allegations for serious offense to the Office of Internal Oversight Services (OIOS). When found guilty, the course of the specific disciplinary action is dependent on the employee status of the offender. UN civilian staff and personnel have functional immunity that can only be waived by the UN Secretary-General. In the case of military personnel, they are subject to the jurisdiction of their respective sending governments. The usual practice for offending soldiers has been to repatriate the personnel and prosecute them in their home country. In several cases, punitive measures are imposed such as demotion or dishonorable dismissal. However, very few among guilty personnel have faced criminal charges in their home countries after repatriation.

Myanmar 
In 2016–2017 and beyond, many Rohingya Muslim women were raped by Burmese soldiers during the Rohingya genocide.

Tigray 

In the Tigray War that started in November 2020 in the Tigray Region of Ethiopia, there were widespread reports of rape and other sexual abuse. Europe External Programme with Africa (EEPA) described an incident of six young girls raped in Mekelle in which the Ethiopian National Defense Force (ENDF) soldiers justified the rape on the grounds that "[the girls]' father is Dr. Debretsion and [the soldiers father]' is Dr. Abiy. We are not all the same", in reference to the two main political leaders of the conflict, Debretsion Gebremichael, the deposed leader of the Tigray Region, and Abiy Ahmed, the prime minister of Ethiopia. Weyni Abraha from Yikono, a Tigrayan women's rights group, viewed the sexual violence as a deliberate use of rape as a weapon of war, stating "This is being done purposely to break the morale of the people, threaten them and make them give up the fight."

Arguments for sexual violence in the Tigray War constituting a deliberate campaign satisfying the definition of genocide include the well-organised command hierarchy of the ENDF as the largest contributor of armed forces to United Nations peacekeeping operations, the strict command hierarchy of the Eritrean Defence Forces (EDF) as the tool of a totalitarian state, testimonies about soldiers refusing to rape being punished, the systematic continuation of patterns of rape over six to seven months, and similarities with rape during the Bosnian War and during the Rwandan genocide.

Rape camps

A rape camp is a detention facility that is designed for or turns into a place where detainees are systematically and repeatedly raped, under the control and authority of state or non-state, armed or civilian, organisational structures.

Late twentieth and early twenty-first centuries

Bosnian War
Rape camps set up by the Bosnian Serb authorities have been extensively documented in the Bosnian War.

Tigray War
Sexual violence in the Tigray War included three known rape camps: a rape camp in Hawzen established by the Ethiopian National Defense Force (ENDF) and with rapists from the ENDF and Eritrean Defence Forces (EDF); an ENDF–EDF rape camp at a construction site during which queueing rapists took turns to hold the baby of the victim; and a third rape camp next to a river.

Forced prostitution and sexual slavery in war

Forced prostitution and sexual slavery are distinct as forms of war rape, as they entail more than the opportunistic rape by soldiers of women captives. Instead, women and girls are forced into sexual slavery, in some cases for prolonged periods. This is defined by the UN as "the status or condition of a person over whom any or all of the powers attaching to the right of ownership are exercised, including sexual access through rape or other forms of sexual violence". War time forced prostitution takes several forms ranging from individual trafficking by armed forces to the institutionalization of the act of rape by military or civil authorities. The term 'forced prostitution' is often used in the press to refer to women and girls displaced by war who are forced to engage in prostitution to survive.

Heraldic penis controversy 

In 2007, commander Karl Engelbrektson decided that the lion's penis in the coat of arms of the Nordic Battlegroup had to be removed. Contrary to initial media reports that the decision was taken following complaints from female soldiers, Engelbrektsson revealed in a February 2008 interview with Sveriges Radio that it was he who made the decision, based on the 2000 United Nations Security Council Resolution 1325 on women, peace, and security. Since civilian women are often sexually assaulted in the war zones of the world, the commander did not consider the depiction of a penis appropriate on a uniform worn into battle. The decision was questioned by some Swedish heraldists, with Vladimir Sagerlund asserting that coats of arms containing lions without a penis were historically given to those who had betrayed the Swedish Crown. The state heraldist Henrik Klackenberg complained that his heraldry unit should have been consulted before making such change, but did not intend to take legal action. The controversy attracted attention from countries around the world.

See also

Gendercide
Genocidal rape
Raptio, the historic term for the large-scale abduction of women during wars
Sexual slavery
Total war
Violence against women
White Terror (Spain)

References

Citations

Bibliography

Further reading

 "IHL Primer on Sexual Violence". International Humanitarian Law Research Initiative, June 2009.
 Kevin Gerard Neill. "Duty, Honor, Rape: Sexual Assault Against Women During War". Journal of International Women's Studies.
 Kathryn Farr. "Extreme War Rape in Today's Civil-war-torn States". Paper presented at the annual meeting of the American Sociological Association, New York City, 11 August 2007.
 
Our Bodies, Their Battlefield: What War Does to Women (London: William Collins, 2020. )

 
Crimes against women
Sex crimes
Sexual misconduct
Violence against men
Violence against women
Sexual violence
Sexual violence

de:Vergewaltigung#Vergewaltigungen im Krieg